

127001–127100 

|-bgcolor=#E9E9E9
| 127001 ||  || — || March 23, 2002 || Socorro || LINEAR || — || align=right | 3.5 km || 
|-id=002 bgcolor=#fefefe
| 127002 ||  || — || March 30, 2002 || Palomar || NEAT || — || align=right | 1.8 km || 
|-id=003 bgcolor=#E9E9E9
| 127003 || 2002 GO || — || April 3, 2002 || Kvistaberg || UDAS || — || align=right | 6.3 km || 
|-id=004 bgcolor=#E9E9E9
| 127004 ||  || — || April 3, 2002 || Kvistaberg || UDAS || — || align=right | 3.7 km || 
|-id=005 bgcolor=#fefefe
| 127005 Pratchett ||  ||  || April 1, 2002 || Needville || J. Dellinger, W. G. Dillon || — || align=right | 1.2 km || 
|-id=006 bgcolor=#E9E9E9
| 127006 ||  || — || April 9, 2002 || Palomar || NEAT || — || align=right | 2.6 km || 
|-id=007 bgcolor=#E9E9E9
| 127007 ||  || — || April 12, 2002 || Desert Eagle || W. K. Y. Yeung || — || align=right | 2.2 km || 
|-id=008 bgcolor=#E9E9E9
| 127008 ||  || — || April 12, 2002 || Palomar || NEAT || JUN || align=right | 2.7 km || 
|-id=009 bgcolor=#E9E9E9
| 127009 ||  || — || April 14, 2002 || Desert Eagle || W. K. Y. Yeung || HNS || align=right | 3.1 km || 
|-id=010 bgcolor=#E9E9E9
| 127010 ||  || — || April 14, 2002 || Desert Eagle || W. K. Y. Yeung || — || align=right | 2.3 km || 
|-id=011 bgcolor=#E9E9E9
| 127011 ||  || — || April 14, 2002 || Desert Eagle || W. K. Y. Yeung || MIT || align=right | 4.6 km || 
|-id=012 bgcolor=#E9E9E9
| 127012 ||  || — || April 15, 2002 || Desert Eagle || W. K. Y. Yeung || — || align=right | 3.9 km || 
|-id=013 bgcolor=#E9E9E9
| 127013 ||  || — || April 15, 2002 || Desert Eagle || W. K. Y. Yeung || — || align=right | 4.3 km || 
|-id=014 bgcolor=#d6d6d6
| 127014 ||  || — || April 15, 2002 || Desert Eagle || W. K. Y. Yeung || HYG || align=right | 5.4 km || 
|-id=015 bgcolor=#d6d6d6
| 127015 ||  || — || April 14, 2002 || Socorro || LINEAR || — || align=right | 4.5 km || 
|-id=016 bgcolor=#d6d6d6
| 127016 ||  || — || April 15, 2002 || Socorro || LINEAR || THM || align=right | 4.8 km || 
|-id=017 bgcolor=#E9E9E9
| 127017 ||  || — || April 15, 2002 || Socorro || LINEAR || GEF || align=right | 2.4 km || 
|-id=018 bgcolor=#E9E9E9
| 127018 ||  || — || April 15, 2002 || Socorro || LINEAR || MAR || align=right | 2.9 km || 
|-id=019 bgcolor=#d6d6d6
| 127019 ||  || — || April 15, 2002 || Socorro || LINEAR || HYG || align=right | 5.9 km || 
|-id=020 bgcolor=#d6d6d6
| 127020 ||  || — || April 15, 2002 || Socorro || LINEAR || EOS || align=right | 3.3 km || 
|-id=021 bgcolor=#E9E9E9
| 127021 ||  || — || April 15, 2002 || Socorro || LINEAR || BRU || align=right | 6.4 km || 
|-id=022 bgcolor=#E9E9E9
| 127022 ||  || — || April 14, 2002 || Palomar || NEAT || JUN || align=right | 2.0 km || 
|-id=023 bgcolor=#E9E9E9
| 127023 ||  || — || April 14, 2002 || Socorro || LINEAR || — || align=right | 1.8 km || 
|-id=024 bgcolor=#d6d6d6
| 127024 ||  || — || April 14, 2002 || Socorro || LINEAR || — || align=right | 5.6 km || 
|-id=025 bgcolor=#d6d6d6
| 127025 ||  || — || April 14, 2002 || Socorro || LINEAR || — || align=right | 4.9 km || 
|-id=026 bgcolor=#E9E9E9
| 127026 ||  || — || April 14, 2002 || Socorro || LINEAR || — || align=right | 4.3 km || 
|-id=027 bgcolor=#d6d6d6
| 127027 ||  || — || April 14, 2002 || Haleakala || NEAT || — || align=right | 6.0 km || 
|-id=028 bgcolor=#E9E9E9
| 127028 ||  || — || April 15, 2002 || Palomar || NEAT || MIS || align=right | 3.7 km || 
|-id=029 bgcolor=#E9E9E9
| 127029 ||  || — || April 11, 2002 || Palomar || NEAT || — || align=right | 3.6 km || 
|-id=030 bgcolor=#E9E9E9
| 127030 Herrington ||  ||  || April 6, 2002 || Cerro Tololo || M. W. Buie || HEN || align=right | 1.8 km || 
|-id=031 bgcolor=#fefefe
| 127031 ||  || — || April 1, 2002 || Palomar || NEAT || — || align=right | 1.8 km || 
|-id=032 bgcolor=#d6d6d6
| 127032 ||  || — || April 1, 2002 || Palomar || NEAT || EOS || align=right | 3.5 km || 
|-id=033 bgcolor=#d6d6d6
| 127033 ||  || — || April 1, 2002 || Palomar || NEAT || EOS || align=right | 4.6 km || 
|-id=034 bgcolor=#fefefe
| 127034 ||  || — || April 2, 2002 || Palomar || NEAT || — || align=right | 2.4 km || 
|-id=035 bgcolor=#d6d6d6
| 127035 ||  || — || April 2, 2002 || Palomar || NEAT || — || align=right | 5.0 km || 
|-id=036 bgcolor=#fefefe
| 127036 ||  || — || April 2, 2002 || Palomar || NEAT || — || align=right | 1.8 km || 
|-id=037 bgcolor=#fefefe
| 127037 ||  || — || April 1, 2002 || Palomar || NEAT || — || align=right | 3.1 km || 
|-id=038 bgcolor=#E9E9E9
| 127038 ||  || — || April 2, 2002 || Kitt Peak || Spacewatch || — || align=right | 2.2 km || 
|-id=039 bgcolor=#d6d6d6
| 127039 ||  || — || April 2, 2002 || Kitt Peak || Spacewatch || — || align=right | 3.3 km || 
|-id=040 bgcolor=#d6d6d6
| 127040 ||  || — || April 2, 2002 || Kitt Peak || Spacewatch || KOR || align=right | 2.8 km || 
|-id=041 bgcolor=#d6d6d6
| 127041 ||  || — || April 4, 2002 || Palomar || NEAT || — || align=right | 5.2 km || 
|-id=042 bgcolor=#E9E9E9
| 127042 ||  || — || April 4, 2002 || Palomar || NEAT || — || align=right | 2.5 km || 
|-id=043 bgcolor=#E9E9E9
| 127043 ||  || — || April 4, 2002 || Palomar || NEAT || — || align=right | 4.9 km || 
|-id=044 bgcolor=#E9E9E9
| 127044 ||  || — || April 4, 2002 || Palomar || NEAT || AGN || align=right | 2.5 km || 
|-id=045 bgcolor=#E9E9E9
| 127045 ||  || — || April 4, 2002 || Palomar || NEAT || — || align=right | 2.8 km || 
|-id=046 bgcolor=#d6d6d6
| 127046 ||  || — || April 4, 2002 || Palomar || NEAT || THM || align=right | 4.9 km || 
|-id=047 bgcolor=#E9E9E9
| 127047 ||  || — || April 4, 2002 || Haleakala || NEAT || — || align=right | 2.9 km || 
|-id=048 bgcolor=#E9E9E9
| 127048 ||  || — || April 4, 2002 || Palomar || NEAT || — || align=right | 3.6 km || 
|-id=049 bgcolor=#E9E9E9
| 127049 ||  || — || April 4, 2002 || Palomar || NEAT || — || align=right | 6.2 km || 
|-id=050 bgcolor=#E9E9E9
| 127050 ||  || — || April 4, 2002 || Palomar || NEAT || — || align=right | 2.5 km || 
|-id=051 bgcolor=#d6d6d6
| 127051 ||  || — || April 4, 2002 || Palomar || NEAT || EOS || align=right | 4.1 km || 
|-id=052 bgcolor=#E9E9E9
| 127052 ||  || — || April 2, 2002 || Palomar || NEAT || — || align=right | 3.2 km || 
|-id=053 bgcolor=#d6d6d6
| 127053 ||  || — || April 4, 2002 || Haleakala || NEAT || VER || align=right | 7.4 km || 
|-id=054 bgcolor=#E9E9E9
| 127054 ||  || — || April 4, 2002 || Palomar || NEAT || — || align=right | 4.0 km || 
|-id=055 bgcolor=#E9E9E9
| 127055 ||  || — || April 4, 2002 || Haleakala || NEAT || — || align=right | 2.1 km || 
|-id=056 bgcolor=#d6d6d6
| 127056 ||  || — || April 4, 2002 || Kitt Peak || Spacewatch || — || align=right | 3.4 km || 
|-id=057 bgcolor=#E9E9E9
| 127057 ||  || — || April 4, 2002 || Haleakala || NEAT || — || align=right | 3.5 km || 
|-id=058 bgcolor=#d6d6d6
| 127058 ||  || — || April 4, 2002 || Palomar || NEAT || KOR || align=right | 2.6 km || 
|-id=059 bgcolor=#E9E9E9
| 127059 ||  || — || April 5, 2002 || Palomar || NEAT || — || align=right | 5.0 km || 
|-id=060 bgcolor=#d6d6d6
| 127060 ||  || — || April 5, 2002 || Anderson Mesa || LONEOS || KOR || align=right | 2.9 km || 
|-id=061 bgcolor=#d6d6d6
| 127061 ||  || — || April 5, 2002 || Anderson Mesa || LONEOS || — || align=right | 6.7 km || 
|-id=062 bgcolor=#E9E9E9
| 127062 ||  || — || April 5, 2002 || Anderson Mesa || LONEOS || — || align=right | 2.2 km || 
|-id=063 bgcolor=#d6d6d6
| 127063 ||  || — || April 5, 2002 || Anderson Mesa || LONEOS || — || align=right | 5.7 km || 
|-id=064 bgcolor=#E9E9E9
| 127064 ||  || — || April 5, 2002 || Anderson Mesa || LONEOS || EUN || align=right | 3.4 km || 
|-id=065 bgcolor=#d6d6d6
| 127065 ||  || — || April 5, 2002 || Anderson Mesa || LONEOS || THM || align=right | 4.9 km || 
|-id=066 bgcolor=#d6d6d6
| 127066 ||  || — || April 5, 2002 || Palomar || NEAT || — || align=right | 5.0 km || 
|-id=067 bgcolor=#d6d6d6
| 127067 ||  || — || April 5, 2002 || Palomar || NEAT || EOS || align=right | 3.9 km || 
|-id=068 bgcolor=#E9E9E9
| 127068 ||  || — || April 8, 2002 || Palomar || NEAT || — || align=right | 5.4 km || 
|-id=069 bgcolor=#E9E9E9
| 127069 ||  || — || April 8, 2002 || Palomar || NEAT || — || align=right | 3.4 km || 
|-id=070 bgcolor=#E9E9E9
| 127070 ||  || — || April 8, 2002 || Palomar || NEAT || — || align=right | 4.1 km || 
|-id=071 bgcolor=#E9E9E9
| 127071 ||  || — || April 8, 2002 || Palomar || NEAT || — || align=right | 2.8 km || 
|-id=072 bgcolor=#E9E9E9
| 127072 ||  || — || April 8, 2002 || Palomar || NEAT || — || align=right | 2.9 km || 
|-id=073 bgcolor=#d6d6d6
| 127073 ||  || — || April 8, 2002 || Palomar || NEAT || — || align=right | 4.8 km || 
|-id=074 bgcolor=#E9E9E9
| 127074 ||  || — || April 8, 2002 || Palomar || NEAT || — || align=right | 4.4 km || 
|-id=075 bgcolor=#E9E9E9
| 127075 ||  || — || April 8, 2002 || Palomar || NEAT || — || align=right | 2.1 km || 
|-id=076 bgcolor=#d6d6d6
| 127076 ||  || — || April 8, 2002 || Palomar || NEAT || — || align=right | 6.2 km || 
|-id=077 bgcolor=#d6d6d6
| 127077 ||  || — || April 6, 2002 || Socorro || LINEAR || — || align=right | 6.2 km || 
|-id=078 bgcolor=#d6d6d6
| 127078 ||  || — || April 8, 2002 || Kitt Peak || Spacewatch || — || align=right | 4.0 km || 
|-id=079 bgcolor=#d6d6d6
| 127079 ||  || — || April 8, 2002 || Palomar || NEAT || — || align=right | 3.7 km || 
|-id=080 bgcolor=#d6d6d6
| 127080 ||  || — || April 8, 2002 || Palomar || NEAT || HYG || align=right | 3.9 km || 
|-id=081 bgcolor=#E9E9E9
| 127081 ||  || — || April 8, 2002 || Palomar || NEAT || — || align=right | 3.3 km || 
|-id=082 bgcolor=#E9E9E9
| 127082 ||  || — || April 8, 2002 || Palomar || NEAT || — || align=right | 4.6 km || 
|-id=083 bgcolor=#E9E9E9
| 127083 ||  || — || April 8, 2002 || Palomar || NEAT || HOF || align=right | 5.2 km || 
|-id=084 bgcolor=#E9E9E9
| 127084 ||  || — || April 9, 2002 || Anderson Mesa || LONEOS || MRX || align=right | 1.9 km || 
|-id=085 bgcolor=#E9E9E9
| 127085 ||  || — || April 9, 2002 || Anderson Mesa || LONEOS || GEF || align=right | 2.3 km || 
|-id=086 bgcolor=#E9E9E9
| 127086 ||  || — || April 9, 2002 || Socorro || LINEAR || — || align=right | 4.2 km || 
|-id=087 bgcolor=#d6d6d6
| 127087 ||  || — || April 9, 2002 || Palomar || NEAT || — || align=right | 4.7 km || 
|-id=088 bgcolor=#E9E9E9
| 127088 ||  || — || April 9, 2002 || Kitt Peak || Spacewatch || — || align=right | 1.6 km || 
|-id=089 bgcolor=#E9E9E9
| 127089 ||  || — || April 9, 2002 || Palomar || NEAT || GEF || align=right | 2.5 km || 
|-id=090 bgcolor=#E9E9E9
| 127090 ||  || — || April 9, 2002 || Anderson Mesa || LONEOS || — || align=right | 4.4 km || 
|-id=091 bgcolor=#d6d6d6
| 127091 ||  || — || April 10, 2002 || Palomar || NEAT || ARM || align=right | 6.7 km || 
|-id=092 bgcolor=#d6d6d6
| 127092 ||  || — || April 10, 2002 || Socorro || LINEAR || — || align=right | 4.3 km || 
|-id=093 bgcolor=#E9E9E9
| 127093 ||  || — || April 10, 2002 || Socorro || LINEAR || — || align=right | 3.5 km || 
|-id=094 bgcolor=#d6d6d6
| 127094 ||  || — || April 10, 2002 || Socorro || LINEAR || — || align=right | 6.9 km || 
|-id=095 bgcolor=#E9E9E9
| 127095 ||  || — || April 10, 2002 || Socorro || LINEAR || — || align=right | 4.6 km || 
|-id=096 bgcolor=#E9E9E9
| 127096 ||  || — || April 10, 2002 || Socorro || LINEAR || — || align=right | 2.2 km || 
|-id=097 bgcolor=#E9E9E9
| 127097 ||  || — || April 10, 2002 || Socorro || LINEAR || GEF || align=right | 2.6 km || 
|-id=098 bgcolor=#d6d6d6
| 127098 ||  || — || April 10, 2002 || Socorro || LINEAR || — || align=right | 6.5 km || 
|-id=099 bgcolor=#d6d6d6
| 127099 ||  || — || April 10, 2002 || Socorro || LINEAR || — || align=right | 7.3 km || 
|-id=100 bgcolor=#d6d6d6
| 127100 ||  || — || April 10, 2002 || Socorro || LINEAR || — || align=right | 8.2 km || 
|}

127101–127200 

|-bgcolor=#E9E9E9
| 127101 ||  || — || April 10, 2002 || Socorro || LINEAR || — || align=right | 4.4 km || 
|-id=102 bgcolor=#E9E9E9
| 127102 ||  || — || April 10, 2002 || Socorro || LINEAR || GER || align=right | 2.8 km || 
|-id=103 bgcolor=#d6d6d6
| 127103 ||  || — || April 10, 2002 || Socorro || LINEAR || — || align=right | 7.0 km || 
|-id=104 bgcolor=#E9E9E9
| 127104 ||  || — || April 10, 2002 || Socorro || LINEAR || — || align=right | 3.1 km || 
|-id=105 bgcolor=#E9E9E9
| 127105 ||  || — || April 10, 2002 || Palomar || NEAT || — || align=right | 3.9 km || 
|-id=106 bgcolor=#E9E9E9
| 127106 ||  || — || April 8, 2002 || Palomar || NEAT || — || align=right | 3.4 km || 
|-id=107 bgcolor=#E9E9E9
| 127107 ||  || — || April 9, 2002 || Kitt Peak || Spacewatch || HEN || align=right | 2.1 km || 
|-id=108 bgcolor=#E9E9E9
| 127108 ||  || — || April 9, 2002 || Socorro || LINEAR || — || align=right | 2.4 km || 
|-id=109 bgcolor=#E9E9E9
| 127109 ||  || — || April 9, 2002 || Socorro || LINEAR || — || align=right | 3.1 km || 
|-id=110 bgcolor=#E9E9E9
| 127110 ||  || — || April 9, 2002 || Socorro || LINEAR || NEM || align=right | 4.5 km || 
|-id=111 bgcolor=#E9E9E9
| 127111 ||  || — || April 9, 2002 || Socorro || LINEAR || DOR || align=right | 4.3 km || 
|-id=112 bgcolor=#E9E9E9
| 127112 ||  || — || April 9, 2002 || Socorro || LINEAR || — || align=right | 3.1 km || 
|-id=113 bgcolor=#E9E9E9
| 127113 ||  || — || April 9, 2002 || Kitt Peak || Spacewatch || — || align=right | 1.8 km || 
|-id=114 bgcolor=#E9E9E9
| 127114 ||  || — || April 10, 2002 || Socorro || LINEAR || — || align=right | 2.6 km || 
|-id=115 bgcolor=#E9E9E9
| 127115 ||  || — || April 10, 2002 || Socorro || LINEAR || HNS || align=right | 2.4 km || 
|-id=116 bgcolor=#E9E9E9
| 127116 ||  || — || April 10, 2002 || Socorro || LINEAR || — || align=right | 2.2 km || 
|-id=117 bgcolor=#E9E9E9
| 127117 ||  || — || April 10, 2002 || Socorro || LINEAR || HNA || align=right | 4.3 km || 
|-id=118 bgcolor=#d6d6d6
| 127118 ||  || — || April 10, 2002 || Socorro || LINEAR || — || align=right | 5.0 km || 
|-id=119 bgcolor=#E9E9E9
| 127119 ||  || — || April 10, 2002 || Socorro || LINEAR || — || align=right | 4.1 km || 
|-id=120 bgcolor=#fefefe
| 127120 ||  || — || April 10, 2002 || Socorro || LINEAR || FLO || align=right | 1.2 km || 
|-id=121 bgcolor=#E9E9E9
| 127121 ||  || — || April 10, 2002 || Socorro || LINEAR || — || align=right | 3.0 km || 
|-id=122 bgcolor=#d6d6d6
| 127122 ||  || — || April 10, 2002 || Socorro || LINEAR || VER || align=right | 5.9 km || 
|-id=123 bgcolor=#E9E9E9
| 127123 ||  || — || April 10, 2002 || Socorro || LINEAR || — || align=right | 2.9 km || 
|-id=124 bgcolor=#E9E9E9
| 127124 ||  || — || April 10, 2002 || Socorro || LINEAR || — || align=right | 4.5 km || 
|-id=125 bgcolor=#E9E9E9
| 127125 ||  || — || April 10, 2002 || Socorro || LINEAR || GEF || align=right | 2.8 km || 
|-id=126 bgcolor=#E9E9E9
| 127126 ||  || — || April 10, 2002 || Socorro || LINEAR || GEF || align=right | 2.6 km || 
|-id=127 bgcolor=#E9E9E9
| 127127 ||  || — || April 10, 2002 || Socorro || LINEAR || — || align=right | 2.4 km || 
|-id=128 bgcolor=#E9E9E9
| 127128 ||  || — || April 10, 2002 || Socorro || LINEAR || GEF || align=right | 2.2 km || 
|-id=129 bgcolor=#E9E9E9
| 127129 ||  || — || April 10, 2002 || Socorro || LINEAR || — || align=right | 4.3 km || 
|-id=130 bgcolor=#E9E9E9
| 127130 ||  || — || April 11, 2002 || Anderson Mesa || LONEOS || — || align=right | 2.5 km || 
|-id=131 bgcolor=#d6d6d6
| 127131 ||  || — || April 11, 2002 || Anderson Mesa || LONEOS || — || align=right | 5.3 km || 
|-id=132 bgcolor=#E9E9E9
| 127132 ||  || — || April 11, 2002 || Anderson Mesa || LONEOS || — || align=right | 4.1 km || 
|-id=133 bgcolor=#E9E9E9
| 127133 ||  || — || April 11, 2002 || Anderson Mesa || LONEOS || ADE || align=right | 4.2 km || 
|-id=134 bgcolor=#d6d6d6
| 127134 ||  || — || April 11, 2002 || Socorro || LINEAR || — || align=right | 4.0 km || 
|-id=135 bgcolor=#d6d6d6
| 127135 ||  || — || April 11, 2002 || Palomar || NEAT || URS || align=right | 5.9 km || 
|-id=136 bgcolor=#E9E9E9
| 127136 ||  || — || April 10, 2002 || Socorro || LINEAR || XIZ || align=right | 2.4 km || 
|-id=137 bgcolor=#E9E9E9
| 127137 ||  || — || April 10, 2002 || Socorro || LINEAR || — || align=right | 1.7 km || 
|-id=138 bgcolor=#E9E9E9
| 127138 ||  || — || April 10, 2002 || Socorro || LINEAR || — || align=right | 3.8 km || 
|-id=139 bgcolor=#E9E9E9
| 127139 ||  || — || April 10, 2002 || Socorro || LINEAR || MRX || align=right | 2.4 km || 
|-id=140 bgcolor=#E9E9E9
| 127140 ||  || — || April 11, 2002 || Socorro || LINEAR || — || align=right | 2.9 km || 
|-id=141 bgcolor=#E9E9E9
| 127141 ||  || — || April 11, 2002 || Socorro || LINEAR || WIT || align=right | 2.1 km || 
|-id=142 bgcolor=#E9E9E9
| 127142 ||  || — || April 11, 2002 || Socorro || LINEAR || GEF || align=right | 2.5 km || 
|-id=143 bgcolor=#d6d6d6
| 127143 ||  || — || April 11, 2002 || Socorro || LINEAR || EOS || align=right | 7.3 km || 
|-id=144 bgcolor=#E9E9E9
| 127144 ||  || — || April 11, 2002 || Socorro || LINEAR || — || align=right | 2.7 km || 
|-id=145 bgcolor=#d6d6d6
| 127145 ||  || — || April 12, 2002 || Palomar || NEAT || — || align=right | 5.4 km || 
|-id=146 bgcolor=#d6d6d6
| 127146 ||  || — || April 12, 2002 || Palomar || NEAT || 615 || align=right | 2.3 km || 
|-id=147 bgcolor=#E9E9E9
| 127147 ||  || — || April 10, 2002 || Socorro || LINEAR || — || align=right | 2.5 km || 
|-id=148 bgcolor=#d6d6d6
| 127148 ||  || — || April 11, 2002 || Socorro || LINEAR || — || align=right | 4.5 km || 
|-id=149 bgcolor=#E9E9E9
| 127149 ||  || — || April 12, 2002 || Socorro || LINEAR || HOF || align=right | 4.4 km || 
|-id=150 bgcolor=#d6d6d6
| 127150 ||  || — || April 12, 2002 || Palomar || NEAT || — || align=right | 5.4 km || 
|-id=151 bgcolor=#fefefe
| 127151 ||  || — || April 12, 2002 || Socorro || LINEAR || FLO || align=right | 1.4 km || 
|-id=152 bgcolor=#E9E9E9
| 127152 ||  || — || April 12, 2002 || Socorro || LINEAR || — || align=right | 2.2 km || 
|-id=153 bgcolor=#d6d6d6
| 127153 ||  || — || April 12, 2002 || Socorro || LINEAR || KOR || align=right | 2.9 km || 
|-id=154 bgcolor=#E9E9E9
| 127154 ||  || — || April 12, 2002 || Socorro || LINEAR || — || align=right | 3.6 km || 
|-id=155 bgcolor=#E9E9E9
| 127155 ||  || — || April 12, 2002 || Socorro || LINEAR || — || align=right | 2.2 km || 
|-id=156 bgcolor=#d6d6d6
| 127156 ||  || — || April 12, 2002 || Socorro || LINEAR || EOS || align=right | 3.3 km || 
|-id=157 bgcolor=#d6d6d6
| 127157 ||  || — || April 13, 2002 || Kitt Peak || Spacewatch || — || align=right | 4.4 km || 
|-id=158 bgcolor=#E9E9E9
| 127158 ||  || — || April 13, 2002 || Kitt Peak || Spacewatch || HEN || align=right | 1.9 km || 
|-id=159 bgcolor=#d6d6d6
| 127159 ||  || — || April 13, 2002 || Palomar || NEAT || — || align=right | 4.3 km || 
|-id=160 bgcolor=#d6d6d6
| 127160 ||  || — || April 13, 2002 || Palomar || NEAT || EOS || align=right | 3.7 km || 
|-id=161 bgcolor=#d6d6d6
| 127161 ||  || — || April 13, 2002 || Kitt Peak || Spacewatch || — || align=right | 4.0 km || 
|-id=162 bgcolor=#E9E9E9
| 127162 ||  || — || April 11, 2002 || Palomar || NEAT || — || align=right | 2.5 km || 
|-id=163 bgcolor=#E9E9E9
| 127163 ||  || — || April 11, 2002 || Palomar || NEAT || — || align=right | 2.2 km || 
|-id=164 bgcolor=#E9E9E9
| 127164 ||  || — || April 14, 2002 || Kitt Peak || Spacewatch || AGN || align=right | 1.9 km || 
|-id=165 bgcolor=#E9E9E9
| 127165 ||  || — || April 14, 2002 || Socorro || LINEAR || — || align=right | 3.8 km || 
|-id=166 bgcolor=#E9E9E9
| 127166 ||  || — || April 14, 2002 || Socorro || LINEAR || AGN || align=right | 2.2 km || 
|-id=167 bgcolor=#d6d6d6
| 127167 ||  || — || April 14, 2002 || Socorro || LINEAR || — || align=right | 5.2 km || 
|-id=168 bgcolor=#d6d6d6
| 127168 ||  || — || April 14, 2002 || Palomar || NEAT || BRA || align=right | 3.3 km || 
|-id=169 bgcolor=#E9E9E9
| 127169 ||  || — || April 12, 2002 || Palomar || NEAT || — || align=right | 2.7 km || 
|-id=170 bgcolor=#d6d6d6
| 127170 ||  || — || April 12, 2002 || Palomar || NEAT || — || align=right | 3.1 km || 
|-id=171 bgcolor=#d6d6d6
| 127171 ||  || — || April 12, 2002 || Palomar || NEAT || — || align=right | 5.4 km || 
|-id=172 bgcolor=#E9E9E9
| 127172 ||  || — || April 13, 2002 || Palomar || NEAT || — || align=right | 6.6 km || 
|-id=173 bgcolor=#E9E9E9
| 127173 ||  || — || April 13, 2002 || Palomar || NEAT || — || align=right | 4.3 km || 
|-id=174 bgcolor=#E9E9E9
| 127174 ||  || — || April 13, 2002 || Palomar || NEAT || — || align=right | 4.2 km || 
|-id=175 bgcolor=#E9E9E9
| 127175 ||  || — || April 13, 2002 || Palomar || NEAT || — || align=right | 4.5 km || 
|-id=176 bgcolor=#E9E9E9
| 127176 ||  || — || April 14, 2002 || Socorro || LINEAR || — || align=right | 3.4 km || 
|-id=177 bgcolor=#d6d6d6
| 127177 ||  || — || April 15, 2002 || Palomar || NEAT || — || align=right | 5.7 km || 
|-id=178 bgcolor=#d6d6d6
| 127178 ||  || — || April 15, 2002 || Palomar || NEAT || — || align=right | 6.1 km || 
|-id=179 bgcolor=#E9E9E9
| 127179 ||  || — || April 15, 2002 || Anderson Mesa || LONEOS || — || align=right | 3.5 km || 
|-id=180 bgcolor=#E9E9E9
| 127180 ||  || — || April 14, 2002 || Kitt Peak || Spacewatch || HEN || align=right | 2.1 km || 
|-id=181 bgcolor=#E9E9E9
| 127181 ||  || — || April 15, 2002 || Socorro || LINEAR || — || align=right | 2.1 km || 
|-id=182 bgcolor=#E9E9E9
| 127182 ||  || — || April 15, 2002 || Anderson Mesa || LONEOS || — || align=right | 2.6 km || 
|-id=183 bgcolor=#E9E9E9
| 127183 ||  || — || April 9, 2002 || Socorro || LINEAR || — || align=right | 3.4 km || 
|-id=184 bgcolor=#E9E9E9
| 127184 ||  || — || April 9, 2002 || Socorro || LINEAR || — || align=right | 2.7 km || 
|-id=185 bgcolor=#E9E9E9
| 127185 ||  || — || April 10, 2002 || Socorro || LINEAR || MAR || align=right | 2.1 km || 
|-id=186 bgcolor=#E9E9E9
| 127186 ||  || — || April 10, 2002 || Socorro || LINEAR || HEN || align=right | 1.8 km || 
|-id=187 bgcolor=#d6d6d6
| 127187 ||  || — || April 10, 2002 || Socorro || LINEAR || THM || align=right | 4.2 km || 
|-id=188 bgcolor=#E9E9E9
| 127188 ||  || — || April 10, 2002 || Socorro || LINEAR || HEN || align=right | 2.0 km || 
|-id=189 bgcolor=#d6d6d6
| 127189 ||  || — || April 10, 2002 || Socorro || LINEAR || KOR || align=right | 2.3 km || 
|-id=190 bgcolor=#d6d6d6
| 127190 ||  || — || April 10, 2002 || Socorro || LINEAR || — || align=right | 5.2 km || 
|-id=191 bgcolor=#E9E9E9
| 127191 ||  || — || April 11, 2002 || Socorro || LINEAR || — || align=right | 3.6 km || 
|-id=192 bgcolor=#E9E9E9
| 127192 ||  || — || April 11, 2002 || Socorro || LINEAR || — || align=right | 3.1 km || 
|-id=193 bgcolor=#E9E9E9
| 127193 ||  || — || April 11, 2002 || Socorro || LINEAR || ADE || align=right | 4.4 km || 
|-id=194 bgcolor=#E9E9E9
| 127194 ||  || — || April 12, 2002 || Socorro || LINEAR || — || align=right | 4.0 km || 
|-id=195 bgcolor=#d6d6d6
| 127195 ||  || — || April 12, 2002 || Palomar || M. White, M. Collins || EOS || align=right | 2.8 km || 
|-id=196 bgcolor=#E9E9E9
| 127196 Hanaceplechová || 2002 HH ||  || April 16, 2002 || Ondřejov || Ondřejov Obs. || — || align=right | 2.3 km || 
|-id=197 bgcolor=#E9E9E9
| 127197 || 2002 HO || — || April 16, 2002 || Desert Eagle || W. K. Y. Yeung || — || align=right | 2.0 km || 
|-id=198 bgcolor=#d6d6d6
| 127198 ||  || — || April 16, 2002 || Socorro || LINEAR || — || align=right | 4.3 km || 
|-id=199 bgcolor=#E9E9E9
| 127199 ||  || — || April 16, 2002 || Socorro || LINEAR || — || align=right | 2.4 km || 
|-id=200 bgcolor=#d6d6d6
| 127200 ||  || — || April 16, 2002 || Socorro || LINEAR || — || align=right | 7.3 km || 
|}

127201–127300 

|-bgcolor=#E9E9E9
| 127201 ||  || — || April 16, 2002 || Socorro || LINEAR || — || align=right | 5.7 km || 
|-id=202 bgcolor=#d6d6d6
| 127202 ||  || — || April 17, 2002 || Socorro || LINEAR || — || align=right | 5.3 km || 
|-id=203 bgcolor=#E9E9E9
| 127203 ||  || — || April 18, 2002 || Palomar || NEAT || MRX || align=right | 1.7 km || 
|-id=204 bgcolor=#d6d6d6
| 127204 ||  || — || April 18, 2002 || Desert Eagle || W. K. Y. Yeung || — || align=right | 10 km || 
|-id=205 bgcolor=#E9E9E9
| 127205 ||  || — || April 20, 2002 || Kitt Peak || Spacewatch || HEN || align=right | 1.7 km || 
|-id=206 bgcolor=#E9E9E9
| 127206 ||  || — || April 16, 2002 || Socorro || LINEAR || — || align=right | 3.0 km || 
|-id=207 bgcolor=#E9E9E9
| 127207 ||  || — || April 17, 2002 || Socorro || LINEAR || — || align=right | 4.4 km || 
|-id=208 bgcolor=#E9E9E9
| 127208 ||  || — || April 17, 2002 || Socorro || LINEAR || — || align=right | 4.5 km || 
|-id=209 bgcolor=#d6d6d6
| 127209 ||  || — || April 18, 2002 || Haleakala || NEAT || — || align=right | 5.3 km || 
|-id=210 bgcolor=#E9E9E9
| 127210 ||  || — || April 21, 2002 || Palomar || NEAT || — || align=right | 5.2 km || 
|-id=211 bgcolor=#d6d6d6
| 127211 ||  || — || April 22, 2002 || Socorro || LINEAR || EUP || align=right | 13 km || 
|-id=212 bgcolor=#E9E9E9
| 127212 ||  || — || April 23, 2002 || Palomar || NEAT || — || align=right | 3.0 km || 
|-id=213 bgcolor=#d6d6d6
| 127213 ||  || — || April 17, 2002 || Socorro || LINEAR || — || align=right | 4.5 km || 
|-id=214 bgcolor=#d6d6d6
| 127214 ||  || — || April 17, 2002 || Socorro || LINEAR || — || align=right | 5.5 km || 
|-id=215 bgcolor=#E9E9E9
| 127215 ||  || — || April 17, 2002 || Socorro || LINEAR || — || align=right | 3.5 km || 
|-id=216 bgcolor=#E9E9E9
| 127216 ||  || — || April 18, 2002 || Kitt Peak || Spacewatch || — || align=right | 3.8 km || 
|-id=217 bgcolor=#E9E9E9
| 127217 ||  || — || April 16, 2002 || Socorro || LINEAR || — || align=right | 3.0 km || 
|-id=218 bgcolor=#E9E9E9
| 127218 || 2002 JE || — || May 3, 2002 || Desert Eagle || W. K. Y. Yeung || — || align=right | 3.8 km || 
|-id=219 bgcolor=#E9E9E9
| 127219 ||  || — || May 3, 2002 || Anderson Mesa || LONEOS || — || align=right | 2.7 km || 
|-id=220 bgcolor=#E9E9E9
| 127220 ||  || — || May 3, 2002 || Anderson Mesa || LONEOS || — || align=right | 2.4 km || 
|-id=221 bgcolor=#E9E9E9
| 127221 ||  || — || May 5, 2002 || Socorro || LINEAR || GAL || align=right | 2.7 km || 
|-id=222 bgcolor=#d6d6d6
| 127222 ||  || — || May 5, 2002 || Palomar || NEAT || — || align=right | 5.3 km || 
|-id=223 bgcolor=#d6d6d6
| 127223 ||  || — || May 5, 2002 || Palomar || NEAT || — || align=right | 4.5 km || 
|-id=224 bgcolor=#E9E9E9
| 127224 ||  || — || May 6, 2002 || Kitt Peak || Spacewatch || — || align=right | 2.0 km || 
|-id=225 bgcolor=#d6d6d6
| 127225 ||  || — || May 4, 2002 || Palomar || NEAT || HYG || align=right | 6.6 km || 
|-id=226 bgcolor=#E9E9E9
| 127226 ||  || — || May 6, 2002 || Palomar || NEAT || — || align=right | 1.9 km || 
|-id=227 bgcolor=#d6d6d6
| 127227 ||  || — || May 5, 2002 || Anderson Mesa || LONEOS || BRA || align=right | 2.6 km || 
|-id=228 bgcolor=#d6d6d6
| 127228 ||  || — || May 7, 2002 || Socorro || LINEAR || — || align=right | 11 km || 
|-id=229 bgcolor=#d6d6d6
| 127229 ||  || — || May 2, 2002 || Anderson Mesa || LONEOS || — || align=right | 4.9 km || 
|-id=230 bgcolor=#E9E9E9
| 127230 ||  || — || May 7, 2002 || Socorro || LINEAR || — || align=right | 4.8 km || 
|-id=231 bgcolor=#E9E9E9
| 127231 ||  || — || May 8, 2002 || Socorro || LINEAR || DOR || align=right | 5.4 km || 
|-id=232 bgcolor=#E9E9E9
| 127232 ||  || — || May 6, 2002 || Palomar || NEAT || ADE || align=right | 5.7 km || 
|-id=233 bgcolor=#E9E9E9
| 127233 ||  || — || May 6, 2002 || Palomar || NEAT || EUN || align=right | 2.1 km || 
|-id=234 bgcolor=#E9E9E9
| 127234 ||  || — || May 7, 2002 || Palomar || NEAT || — || align=right | 2.2 km || 
|-id=235 bgcolor=#E9E9E9
| 127235 ||  || — || May 7, 2002 || Palomar || NEAT || — || align=right | 2.5 km || 
|-id=236 bgcolor=#d6d6d6
| 127236 ||  || — || May 7, 2002 || Palomar || NEAT || — || align=right | 5.6 km || 
|-id=237 bgcolor=#E9E9E9
| 127237 ||  || — || May 7, 2002 || Palomar || NEAT || — || align=right | 5.2 km || 
|-id=238 bgcolor=#E9E9E9
| 127238 ||  || — || May 7, 2002 || Palomar || NEAT || DOR || align=right | 4.6 km || 
|-id=239 bgcolor=#d6d6d6
| 127239 ||  || — || May 8, 2002 || Haleakala || NEAT || — || align=right | 4.8 km || 
|-id=240 bgcolor=#E9E9E9
| 127240 ||  || — || May 8, 2002 || Socorro || LINEAR || — || align=right | 4.8 km || 
|-id=241 bgcolor=#E9E9E9
| 127241 ||  || — || May 8, 2002 || Socorro || LINEAR || — || align=right | 2.2 km || 
|-id=242 bgcolor=#E9E9E9
| 127242 ||  || — || May 9, 2002 || Socorro || LINEAR || — || align=right | 2.1 km || 
|-id=243 bgcolor=#E9E9E9
| 127243 ||  || — || May 9, 2002 || Socorro || LINEAR || — || align=right | 3.6 km || 
|-id=244 bgcolor=#d6d6d6
| 127244 ||  || — || May 9, 2002 || Socorro || LINEAR || THM || align=right | 5.4 km || 
|-id=245 bgcolor=#d6d6d6
| 127245 ||  || — || May 9, 2002 || Socorro || LINEAR || — || align=right | 4.8 km || 
|-id=246 bgcolor=#d6d6d6
| 127246 ||  || — || May 9, 2002 || Socorro || LINEAR || EOS || align=right | 3.7 km || 
|-id=247 bgcolor=#E9E9E9
| 127247 ||  || — || May 9, 2002 || Socorro || LINEAR || — || align=right | 4.2 km || 
|-id=248 bgcolor=#E9E9E9
| 127248 ||  || — || May 9, 2002 || Socorro || LINEAR || — || align=right | 3.8 km || 
|-id=249 bgcolor=#d6d6d6
| 127249 ||  || — || May 9, 2002 || Socorro || LINEAR || — || align=right | 4.4 km || 
|-id=250 bgcolor=#E9E9E9
| 127250 ||  || — || May 8, 2002 || Haleakala || NEAT || — || align=right | 1.7 km || 
|-id=251 bgcolor=#d6d6d6
| 127251 ||  || — || May 8, 2002 || Haleakala || NEAT || — || align=right | 6.0 km || 
|-id=252 bgcolor=#E9E9E9
| 127252 ||  || — || May 9, 2002 || Desert Eagle || W. K. Y. Yeung || MAR || align=right | 2.3 km || 
|-id=253 bgcolor=#d6d6d6
| 127253 ||  || — || May 10, 2002 || Desert Eagle || W. K. Y. Yeung || Tj (2.98) || align=right | 12 km || 
|-id=254 bgcolor=#E9E9E9
| 127254 ||  || — || May 8, 2002 || Socorro || LINEAR || — || align=right | 3.1 km || 
|-id=255 bgcolor=#E9E9E9
| 127255 ||  || — || May 8, 2002 || Socorro || LINEAR || AGN || align=right | 2.4 km || 
|-id=256 bgcolor=#d6d6d6
| 127256 ||  || — || May 9, 2002 || Socorro || LINEAR || — || align=right | 7.5 km || 
|-id=257 bgcolor=#E9E9E9
| 127257 ||  || — || May 9, 2002 || Socorro || LINEAR || — || align=right | 4.4 km || 
|-id=258 bgcolor=#E9E9E9
| 127258 ||  || — || May 9, 2002 || Socorro || LINEAR || — || align=right | 5.0 km || 
|-id=259 bgcolor=#E9E9E9
| 127259 ||  || — || May 9, 2002 || Socorro || LINEAR || — || align=right | 2.4 km || 
|-id=260 bgcolor=#d6d6d6
| 127260 ||  || — || May 9, 2002 || Socorro || LINEAR || — || align=right | 4.8 km || 
|-id=261 bgcolor=#E9E9E9
| 127261 ||  || — || May 9, 2002 || Socorro || LINEAR || — || align=right | 5.2 km || 
|-id=262 bgcolor=#E9E9E9
| 127262 ||  || — || May 9, 2002 || Socorro || LINEAR || — || align=right | 2.0 km || 
|-id=263 bgcolor=#d6d6d6
| 127263 ||  || — || May 9, 2002 || Socorro || LINEAR || — || align=right | 8.4 km || 
|-id=264 bgcolor=#E9E9E9
| 127264 ||  || — || May 9, 2002 || Socorro || LINEAR || — || align=right | 2.6 km || 
|-id=265 bgcolor=#E9E9E9
| 127265 ||  || — || May 9, 2002 || Socorro || LINEAR || XIZ || align=right | 4.0 km || 
|-id=266 bgcolor=#d6d6d6
| 127266 ||  || — || May 9, 2002 || Socorro || LINEAR || EOS || align=right | 4.3 km || 
|-id=267 bgcolor=#E9E9E9
| 127267 ||  || — || May 9, 2002 || Socorro || LINEAR || — || align=right | 2.0 km || 
|-id=268 bgcolor=#E9E9E9
| 127268 ||  || — || May 9, 2002 || Socorro || LINEAR || — || align=right | 2.9 km || 
|-id=269 bgcolor=#d6d6d6
| 127269 ||  || — || May 9, 2002 || Socorro || LINEAR || HYG || align=right | 5.5 km || 
|-id=270 bgcolor=#d6d6d6
| 127270 ||  || — || May 9, 2002 || Socorro || LINEAR || — || align=right | 4.2 km || 
|-id=271 bgcolor=#d6d6d6
| 127271 ||  || — || May 10, 2002 || Socorro || LINEAR || — || align=right | 3.6 km || 
|-id=272 bgcolor=#E9E9E9
| 127272 ||  || — || May 5, 2002 || Anderson Mesa || LONEOS || CLO || align=right | 4.1 km || 
|-id=273 bgcolor=#d6d6d6
| 127273 ||  || — || May 11, 2002 || Kitt Peak || Spacewatch || KOR || align=right | 2.7 km || 
|-id=274 bgcolor=#d6d6d6
| 127274 ||  || — || May 8, 2002 || Socorro || LINEAR || — || align=right | 5.0 km || 
|-id=275 bgcolor=#E9E9E9
| 127275 ||  || — || May 8, 2002 || Socorro || LINEAR || — || align=right | 2.7 km || 
|-id=276 bgcolor=#E9E9E9
| 127276 ||  || — || May 9, 2002 || Socorro || LINEAR || — || align=right | 1.7 km || 
|-id=277 bgcolor=#E9E9E9
| 127277 ||  || — || May 9, 2002 || Socorro || LINEAR || — || align=right | 2.7 km || 
|-id=278 bgcolor=#E9E9E9
| 127278 ||  || — || May 9, 2002 || Socorro || LINEAR || AEO || align=right | 3.3 km || 
|-id=279 bgcolor=#d6d6d6
| 127279 ||  || — || May 10, 2002 || Socorro || LINEAR || THM || align=right | 5.3 km || 
|-id=280 bgcolor=#E9E9E9
| 127280 ||  || — || May 10, 2002 || Socorro || LINEAR || — || align=right | 3.1 km || 
|-id=281 bgcolor=#E9E9E9
| 127281 ||  || — || May 7, 2002 || Socorro || LINEAR || — || align=right | 2.6 km || 
|-id=282 bgcolor=#E9E9E9
| 127282 ||  || — || May 7, 2002 || Socorro || LINEAR || — || align=right | 5.6 km || 
|-id=283 bgcolor=#E9E9E9
| 127283 ||  || — || May 7, 2002 || Socorro || LINEAR || RAF || align=right | 1.7 km || 
|-id=284 bgcolor=#E9E9E9
| 127284 ||  || — || May 7, 2002 || Socorro || LINEAR || DOR || align=right | 5.3 km || 
|-id=285 bgcolor=#E9E9E9
| 127285 ||  || — || May 7, 2002 || Socorro || LINEAR || — || align=right | 4.3 km || 
|-id=286 bgcolor=#E9E9E9
| 127286 ||  || — || May 8, 2002 || Socorro || LINEAR || — || align=right | 4.1 km || 
|-id=287 bgcolor=#fefefe
| 127287 ||  || — || May 8, 2002 || Socorro || LINEAR || — || align=right | 1.5 km || 
|-id=288 bgcolor=#E9E9E9
| 127288 ||  || — || May 9, 2002 || Socorro || LINEAR || — || align=right | 4.0 km || 
|-id=289 bgcolor=#E9E9E9
| 127289 ||  || — || May 9, 2002 || Socorro || LINEAR || AEO || align=right | 3.3 km || 
|-id=290 bgcolor=#d6d6d6
| 127290 ||  || — || May 11, 2002 || Socorro || LINEAR || EOS || align=right | 4.2 km || 
|-id=291 bgcolor=#d6d6d6
| 127291 ||  || — || May 11, 2002 || Socorro || LINEAR || KOR || align=right | 2.6 km || 
|-id=292 bgcolor=#E9E9E9
| 127292 ||  || — || May 11, 2002 || Socorro || LINEAR || — || align=right | 2.3 km || 
|-id=293 bgcolor=#E9E9E9
| 127293 ||  || — || May 11, 2002 || Socorro || LINEAR || AGN || align=right | 2.4 km || 
|-id=294 bgcolor=#E9E9E9
| 127294 ||  || — || May 11, 2002 || Socorro || LINEAR || NEM || align=right | 4.3 km || 
|-id=295 bgcolor=#d6d6d6
| 127295 ||  || — || May 11, 2002 || Socorro || LINEAR || KOR || align=right | 2.7 km || 
|-id=296 bgcolor=#d6d6d6
| 127296 ||  || — || May 11, 2002 || Socorro || LINEAR || — || align=right | 5.4 km || 
|-id=297 bgcolor=#E9E9E9
| 127297 ||  || — || May 11, 2002 || Socorro || LINEAR || — || align=right | 1.7 km || 
|-id=298 bgcolor=#E9E9E9
| 127298 ||  || — || May 11, 2002 || Socorro || LINEAR || MIS || align=right | 4.3 km || 
|-id=299 bgcolor=#d6d6d6
| 127299 ||  || — || May 11, 2002 || Socorro || LINEAR || — || align=right | 4.8 km || 
|-id=300 bgcolor=#d6d6d6
| 127300 ||  || — || May 11, 2002 || Socorro || LINEAR || HYG || align=right | 4.7 km || 
|}

127301–127400 

|-bgcolor=#E9E9E9
| 127301 ||  || — || May 11, 2002 || Socorro || LINEAR || — || align=right | 3.3 km || 
|-id=302 bgcolor=#d6d6d6
| 127302 ||  || — || May 11, 2002 || Socorro || LINEAR || — || align=right | 6.2 km || 
|-id=303 bgcolor=#d6d6d6
| 127303 ||  || — || May 11, 2002 || Socorro || LINEAR || THM || align=right | 5.5 km || 
|-id=304 bgcolor=#fefefe
| 127304 ||  || — || May 11, 2002 || Socorro || LINEAR || NYS || align=right | 1.2 km || 
|-id=305 bgcolor=#d6d6d6
| 127305 ||  || — || May 11, 2002 || Socorro || LINEAR || — || align=right | 4.8 km || 
|-id=306 bgcolor=#d6d6d6
| 127306 ||  || — || May 11, 2002 || Socorro || LINEAR || KOR || align=right | 2.6 km || 
|-id=307 bgcolor=#d6d6d6
| 127307 ||  || — || May 11, 2002 || Socorro || LINEAR || LIX || align=right | 6.5 km || 
|-id=308 bgcolor=#d6d6d6
| 127308 ||  || — || May 11, 2002 || Socorro || LINEAR || — || align=right | 5.1 km || 
|-id=309 bgcolor=#d6d6d6
| 127309 ||  || — || May 11, 2002 || Socorro || LINEAR || KOR || align=right | 2.4 km || 
|-id=310 bgcolor=#fefefe
| 127310 ||  || — || May 11, 2002 || Socorro || LINEAR || FLO || align=right data-sort-value="0.83" | 830 m || 
|-id=311 bgcolor=#d6d6d6
| 127311 ||  || — || May 11, 2002 || Socorro || LINEAR || EOS || align=right | 3.6 km || 
|-id=312 bgcolor=#d6d6d6
| 127312 ||  || — || May 11, 2002 || Socorro || LINEAR || 7:4 || align=right | 7.4 km || 
|-id=313 bgcolor=#E9E9E9
| 127313 ||  || — || May 11, 2002 || Socorro || LINEAR || — || align=right | 1.9 km || 
|-id=314 bgcolor=#d6d6d6
| 127314 ||  || — || May 11, 2002 || Socorro || LINEAR || — || align=right | 4.2 km || 
|-id=315 bgcolor=#E9E9E9
| 127315 ||  || — || May 11, 2002 || Socorro || LINEAR || — || align=right | 2.7 km || 
|-id=316 bgcolor=#d6d6d6
| 127316 ||  || — || May 9, 2002 || Haleakala || NEAT || — || align=right | 6.2 km || 
|-id=317 bgcolor=#d6d6d6
| 127317 ||  || — || May 11, 2002 || Palomar || NEAT || — || align=right | 6.3 km || 
|-id=318 bgcolor=#d6d6d6
| 127318 ||  || — || May 8, 2002 || Socorro || LINEAR || — || align=right | 5.9 km || 
|-id=319 bgcolor=#d6d6d6
| 127319 ||  || — || May 13, 2002 || Palomar || NEAT || — || align=right | 6.8 km || 
|-id=320 bgcolor=#E9E9E9
| 127320 ||  || — || May 13, 2002 || Palomar || NEAT || — || align=right | 4.5 km || 
|-id=321 bgcolor=#E9E9E9
| 127321 ||  || — || May 8, 2002 || Socorro || LINEAR || EUN || align=right | 2.5 km || 
|-id=322 bgcolor=#d6d6d6
| 127322 ||  || — || May 14, 2002 || Reedy Creek || J. Broughton || EUP || align=right | 8.1 km || 
|-id=323 bgcolor=#d6d6d6
| 127323 ||  || — || May 7, 2002 || Socorro || LINEAR || EUP || align=right | 9.2 km || 
|-id=324 bgcolor=#E9E9E9
| 127324 ||  || — || May 15, 2002 || Fountain Hills || Fountain Hills Obs. || MIT || align=right | 2.7 km || 
|-id=325 bgcolor=#d6d6d6
| 127325 ||  || — || May 9, 2002 || Socorro || LINEAR || TEL || align=right | 3.2 km || 
|-id=326 bgcolor=#d6d6d6
| 127326 ||  || — || May 9, 2002 || Socorro || LINEAR || — || align=right | 4.7 km || 
|-id=327 bgcolor=#d6d6d6
| 127327 ||  || — || May 10, 2002 || Socorro || LINEAR || — || align=right | 4.5 km || 
|-id=328 bgcolor=#d6d6d6
| 127328 ||  || — || May 12, 2002 || Socorro || LINEAR || — || align=right | 6.2 km || 
|-id=329 bgcolor=#E9E9E9
| 127329 ||  || — || May 14, 2002 || Palomar || NEAT || — || align=right | 3.4 km || 
|-id=330 bgcolor=#d6d6d6
| 127330 ||  || — || May 14, 2002 || Palomar || NEAT || — || align=right | 7.0 km || 
|-id=331 bgcolor=#d6d6d6
| 127331 ||  || — || May 11, 2002 || Socorro || LINEAR || — || align=right | 5.6 km || 
|-id=332 bgcolor=#E9E9E9
| 127332 ||  || — || May 11, 2002 || Socorro || LINEAR || HNA || align=right | 4.3 km || 
|-id=333 bgcolor=#d6d6d6
| 127333 ||  || — || May 11, 2002 || Socorro || LINEAR || — || align=right | 5.9 km || 
|-id=334 bgcolor=#E9E9E9
| 127334 ||  || — || May 11, 2002 || Socorro || LINEAR || — || align=right | 6.1 km || 
|-id=335 bgcolor=#E9E9E9
| 127335 ||  || — || May 13, 2002 || Palomar || NEAT || — || align=right | 3.9 km || 
|-id=336 bgcolor=#d6d6d6
| 127336 ||  || — || May 13, 2002 || Socorro || LINEAR || VER || align=right | 5.6 km || 
|-id=337 bgcolor=#d6d6d6
| 127337 ||  || — || May 4, 2002 || Palomar || NEAT || — || align=right | 4.7 km || 
|-id=338 bgcolor=#d6d6d6
| 127338 ||  || — || May 4, 2002 || Palomar || NEAT || — || align=right | 6.8 km || 
|-id=339 bgcolor=#E9E9E9
| 127339 ||  || — || May 5, 2002 || Palomar || NEAT || EUN || align=right | 2.2 km || 
|-id=340 bgcolor=#d6d6d6
| 127340 ||  || — || May 5, 2002 || Palomar || NEAT || — || align=right | 6.7 km || 
|-id=341 bgcolor=#E9E9E9
| 127341 ||  || — || May 5, 2002 || Palomar || NEAT || — || align=right | 3.4 km || 
|-id=342 bgcolor=#d6d6d6
| 127342 ||  || — || May 5, 2002 || Palomar || NEAT || — || align=right | 7.0 km || 
|-id=343 bgcolor=#E9E9E9
| 127343 ||  || — || May 5, 2002 || Palomar || NEAT || — || align=right | 3.7 km || 
|-id=344 bgcolor=#E9E9E9
| 127344 ||  || — || May 5, 2002 || Palomar || NEAT || — || align=right | 5.7 km || 
|-id=345 bgcolor=#E9E9E9
| 127345 ||  || — || May 5, 2002 || Palomar || NEAT || — || align=right | 4.9 km || 
|-id=346 bgcolor=#E9E9E9
| 127346 ||  || — || May 5, 2002 || Palomar || NEAT || MAR || align=right | 2.4 km || 
|-id=347 bgcolor=#E9E9E9
| 127347 ||  || — || May 5, 2002 || Palomar || NEAT || — || align=right | 4.6 km || 
|-id=348 bgcolor=#E9E9E9
| 127348 ||  || — || May 5, 2002 || Palomar || NEAT || ADE || align=right | 2.8 km || 
|-id=349 bgcolor=#E9E9E9
| 127349 ||  || — || May 5, 2002 || Palomar || NEAT || — || align=right | 3.2 km || 
|-id=350 bgcolor=#d6d6d6
| 127350 ||  || — || May 6, 2002 || Palomar || NEAT || — || align=right | 6.1 km || 
|-id=351 bgcolor=#d6d6d6
| 127351 ||  || — || May 6, 2002 || Palomar || NEAT || — || align=right | 6.6 km || 
|-id=352 bgcolor=#d6d6d6
| 127352 ||  || — || May 6, 2002 || Palomar || NEAT || — || align=right | 5.4 km || 
|-id=353 bgcolor=#E9E9E9
| 127353 ||  || — || May 7, 2002 || Palomar || NEAT || — || align=right | 3.3 km || 
|-id=354 bgcolor=#d6d6d6
| 127354 ||  || — || May 7, 2002 || Socorro || LINEAR || — || align=right | 6.4 km || 
|-id=355 bgcolor=#d6d6d6
| 127355 ||  || — || May 7, 2002 || Anderson Mesa || LONEOS || ALA || align=right | 5.7 km || 
|-id=356 bgcolor=#E9E9E9
| 127356 ||  || — || May 7, 2002 || Palomar || NEAT || — || align=right | 4.4 km || 
|-id=357 bgcolor=#E9E9E9
| 127357 ||  || — || May 7, 2002 || Palomar || NEAT || — || align=right | 2.5 km || 
|-id=358 bgcolor=#E9E9E9
| 127358 ||  || — || May 8, 2002 || Kitt Peak || Spacewatch || — || align=right | 2.0 km || 
|-id=359 bgcolor=#d6d6d6
| 127359 ||  || — || May 8, 2002 || Kitt Peak || Spacewatch || — || align=right | 5.8 km || 
|-id=360 bgcolor=#d6d6d6
| 127360 ||  || — || May 9, 2002 || Palomar || NEAT || — || align=right | 4.8 km || 
|-id=361 bgcolor=#E9E9E9
| 127361 ||  || — || May 9, 2002 || Socorro || LINEAR || — || align=right | 4.0 km || 
|-id=362 bgcolor=#E9E9E9
| 127362 ||  || — || May 9, 2002 || Palomar || NEAT || INO || align=right | 2.5 km || 
|-id=363 bgcolor=#d6d6d6
| 127363 ||  || — || May 9, 2002 || Palomar || NEAT || — || align=right | 6.3 km || 
|-id=364 bgcolor=#E9E9E9
| 127364 ||  || — || May 9, 2002 || Palomar || NEAT || — || align=right | 2.9 km || 
|-id=365 bgcolor=#d6d6d6
| 127365 ||  || — || May 9, 2002 || Palomar || NEAT || — || align=right | 4.1 km || 
|-id=366 bgcolor=#d6d6d6
| 127366 ||  || — || May 9, 2002 || Kitt Peak || Spacewatch || TEL || align=right | 3.1 km || 
|-id=367 bgcolor=#d6d6d6
| 127367 ||  || — || May 9, 2002 || Palomar || NEAT || THM || align=right | 4.3 km || 
|-id=368 bgcolor=#fefefe
| 127368 ||  || — || May 9, 2002 || Palomar || NEAT || V || align=right data-sort-value="0.96" | 960 m || 
|-id=369 bgcolor=#E9E9E9
| 127369 ||  || — || May 12, 2002 || Palomar || NEAT || DOR || align=right | 5.4 km || 
|-id=370 bgcolor=#d6d6d6
| 127370 ||  || — || May 13, 2002 || Palomar || NEAT || — || align=right | 9.4 km || 
|-id=371 bgcolor=#d6d6d6
| 127371 ||  || — || May 13, 2002 || Palomar || NEAT || — || align=right | 6.2 km || 
|-id=372 bgcolor=#d6d6d6
| 127372 ||  || — || May 13, 2002 || Palomar || NEAT || — || align=right | 7.0 km || 
|-id=373 bgcolor=#d6d6d6
| 127373 ||  || — || May 14, 2002 || Palomar || NEAT || — || align=right | 6.4 km || 
|-id=374 bgcolor=#E9E9E9
| 127374 || 2002 KE || — || May 16, 2002 || Fountain Hills || Fountain Hills Obs. || — || align=right | 3.4 km || 
|-id=375 bgcolor=#d6d6d6
| 127375 || 2002 KN || — || May 16, 2002 || Socorro || LINEAR || — || align=right | 6.6 km || 
|-id=376 bgcolor=#fefefe
| 127376 ||  || — || May 17, 2002 || Socorro || LINEAR || H || align=right data-sort-value="0.99" | 990 m || 
|-id=377 bgcolor=#d6d6d6
| 127377 ||  || — || May 17, 2002 || Palomar || NEAT || THM || align=right | 5.3 km || 
|-id=378 bgcolor=#d6d6d6
| 127378 ||  || — || May 18, 2002 || Palomar || NEAT || THM || align=right | 4.7 km || 
|-id=379 bgcolor=#d6d6d6
| 127379 ||  || — || May 17, 2002 || Socorro || LINEAR || ALA || align=right | 8.7 km || 
|-id=380 bgcolor=#d6d6d6
| 127380 ||  || — || May 16, 2002 || Socorro || LINEAR || THM || align=right | 4.1 km || 
|-id=381 bgcolor=#E9E9E9
| 127381 ||  || — || May 16, 2002 || Socorro || LINEAR || — || align=right | 4.2 km || 
|-id=382 bgcolor=#d6d6d6
| 127382 ||  || — || May 27, 2002 || Palomar || NEAT || — || align=right | 5.6 km || 
|-id=383 bgcolor=#E9E9E9
| 127383 ||  || — || May 28, 2002 || Palomar || NEAT || — || align=right | 2.7 km || 
|-id=384 bgcolor=#d6d6d6
| 127384 ||  || — || May 19, 2002 || Palomar || NEAT || EOS || align=right | 3.9 km || 
|-id=385 bgcolor=#d6d6d6
| 127385 ||  || — || May 30, 2002 || Palomar || NEAT || — || align=right | 5.9 km || 
|-id=386 bgcolor=#d6d6d6
| 127386 ||  || — || June 2, 2002 || Palomar || NEAT || — || align=right | 5.2 km || 
|-id=387 bgcolor=#d6d6d6
| 127387 ||  || — || June 5, 2002 || Socorro || LINEAR || TRP || align=right | 5.1 km || 
|-id=388 bgcolor=#d6d6d6
| 127388 ||  || — || June 6, 2002 || Fountain Hills || C. W. Juels, P. R. Holvorcem || — || align=right | 8.2 km || 
|-id=389 bgcolor=#d6d6d6
| 127389 ||  || — || June 1, 2002 || Socorro || LINEAR || EOS || align=right | 4.1 km || 
|-id=390 bgcolor=#d6d6d6
| 127390 ||  || — || June 5, 2002 || Socorro || LINEAR || — || align=right | 5.8 km || 
|-id=391 bgcolor=#d6d6d6
| 127391 ||  || — || June 5, 2002 || Socorro || LINEAR || — || align=right | 5.9 km || 
|-id=392 bgcolor=#d6d6d6
| 127392 ||  || — || June 5, 2002 || Socorro || LINEAR || EOS || align=right | 4.0 km || 
|-id=393 bgcolor=#d6d6d6
| 127393 ||  || — || June 5, 2002 || Socorro || LINEAR || — || align=right | 6.8 km || 
|-id=394 bgcolor=#fefefe
| 127394 ||  || — || June 5, 2002 || Socorro || LINEAR || — || align=right | 1.5 km || 
|-id=395 bgcolor=#d6d6d6
| 127395 ||  || — || June 6, 2002 || Socorro || LINEAR || — || align=right | 6.5 km || 
|-id=396 bgcolor=#d6d6d6
| 127396 ||  || — || June 6, 2002 || Socorro || LINEAR || — || align=right | 4.4 km || 
|-id=397 bgcolor=#d6d6d6
| 127397 ||  || — || June 6, 2002 || Socorro || LINEAR || THM || align=right | 4.4 km || 
|-id=398 bgcolor=#E9E9E9
| 127398 ||  || — || June 6, 2002 || Socorro || LINEAR || — || align=right | 3.3 km || 
|-id=399 bgcolor=#d6d6d6
| 127399 ||  || — || June 8, 2002 || Socorro || LINEAR || — || align=right | 5.5 km || 
|-id=400 bgcolor=#d6d6d6
| 127400 ||  || — || June 2, 2002 || Palomar || NEAT || — || align=right | 6.4 km || 
|}

127401–127500 

|-bgcolor=#E9E9E9
| 127401 ||  || — || June 3, 2002 || Socorro || LINEAR || — || align=right | 4.7 km || 
|-id=402 bgcolor=#d6d6d6
| 127402 ||  || — || June 8, 2002 || Socorro || LINEAR || — || align=right | 5.0 km || 
|-id=403 bgcolor=#d6d6d6
| 127403 ||  || — || June 9, 2002 || Haleakala || NEAT || — || align=right | 5.0 km || 
|-id=404 bgcolor=#d6d6d6
| 127404 ||  || — || June 3, 2002 || Palomar || NEAT || — || align=right | 5.9 km || 
|-id=405 bgcolor=#d6d6d6
| 127405 ||  || — || June 3, 2002 || Socorro || LINEAR || — || align=right | 7.6 km || 
|-id=406 bgcolor=#d6d6d6
| 127406 ||  || — || June 3, 2002 || Socorro || LINEAR || — || align=right | 5.3 km || 
|-id=407 bgcolor=#d6d6d6
| 127407 ||  || — || June 9, 2002 || Palomar || NEAT || — || align=right | 4.8 km || 
|-id=408 bgcolor=#d6d6d6
| 127408 ||  || — || June 12, 2002 || Socorro || LINEAR || — || align=right | 8.9 km || 
|-id=409 bgcolor=#d6d6d6
| 127409 ||  || — || June 5, 2002 || Palomar || NEAT || TEL || align=right | 2.9 km || 
|-id=410 bgcolor=#d6d6d6
| 127410 ||  || — || June 5, 2002 || Palomar || NEAT || — || align=right | 5.5 km || 
|-id=411 bgcolor=#d6d6d6
| 127411 ||  || — || June 10, 2002 || Palomar || NEAT || — || align=right | 5.1 km || 
|-id=412 bgcolor=#d6d6d6
| 127412 ||  || — || June 8, 2002 || Palomar || NEAT || — || align=right | 7.2 km || 
|-id=413 bgcolor=#E9E9E9
| 127413 ||  || — || June 10, 2002 || Socorro || LINEAR || — || align=right | 4.7 km || 
|-id=414 bgcolor=#d6d6d6
| 127414 ||  || — || June 12, 2002 || Socorro || LINEAR || — || align=right | 6.1 km || 
|-id=415 bgcolor=#d6d6d6
| 127415 ||  || — || July 11, 2002 || Campo Imperatore || CINEOS || — || align=right | 4.4 km || 
|-id=416 bgcolor=#d6d6d6
| 127416 ||  || — || July 4, 2002 || Palomar || NEAT || THM || align=right | 3.7 km || 
|-id=417 bgcolor=#d6d6d6
| 127417 ||  || — || July 4, 2002 || Palomar || NEAT || — || align=right | 4.8 km || 
|-id=418 bgcolor=#d6d6d6
| 127418 ||  || — || July 9, 2002 || Socorro || LINEAR || HYG || align=right | 5.3 km || 
|-id=419 bgcolor=#d6d6d6
| 127419 ||  || — || July 9, 2002 || Socorro || LINEAR || — || align=right | 5.1 km || 
|-id=420 bgcolor=#fefefe
| 127420 ||  || — || July 9, 2002 || Socorro || LINEAR || — || align=right | 1.5 km || 
|-id=421 bgcolor=#d6d6d6
| 127421 ||  || — || July 20, 2002 || Palomar || NEAT || — || align=right | 7.9 km || 
|-id=422 bgcolor=#E9E9E9
| 127422 ||  || — || July 18, 2002 || Socorro || LINEAR || — || align=right | 3.3 km || 
|-id=423 bgcolor=#d6d6d6
| 127423 ||  || — || July 18, 2002 || Socorro || LINEAR || EOS || align=right | 3.6 km || 
|-id=424 bgcolor=#d6d6d6
| 127424 ||  || — || July 18, 2002 || Socorro || LINEAR || — || align=right | 6.1 km || 
|-id=425 bgcolor=#d6d6d6
| 127425 ||  || — || July 18, 2002 || Socorro || LINEAR || — || align=right | 6.8 km || 
|-id=426 bgcolor=#d6d6d6
| 127426 ||  || — || July 21, 2002 || Palomar || NEAT || HIL || align=right | 6.6 km || 
|-id=427 bgcolor=#d6d6d6
| 127427 ||  || — || July 22, 2002 || Palomar || NEAT || TIR || align=right | 5.7 km || 
|-id=428 bgcolor=#fefefe
| 127428 || 2002 PX || — || August 1, 2002 || Socorro || LINEAR || H || align=right | 1.1 km || 
|-id=429 bgcolor=#fefefe
| 127429 ||  || — || August 4, 2002 || Palomar || NEAT || — || align=right | 1.5 km || 
|-id=430 bgcolor=#fefefe
| 127430 ||  || — || August 6, 2002 || Palomar || NEAT || — || align=right | 1.4 km || 
|-id=431 bgcolor=#d6d6d6
| 127431 ||  || — || August 6, 2002 || Palomar || NEAT || HYG || align=right | 5.3 km || 
|-id=432 bgcolor=#d6d6d6
| 127432 ||  || — || August 6, 2002 || Palomar || NEAT || — || align=right | 5.8 km || 
|-id=433 bgcolor=#d6d6d6
| 127433 ||  || — || August 6, 2002 || Palomar || NEAT || VER || align=right | 6.6 km || 
|-id=434 bgcolor=#d6d6d6
| 127434 ||  || — || August 6, 2002 || Palomar || NEAT || — || align=right | 6.7 km || 
|-id=435 bgcolor=#d6d6d6
| 127435 ||  || — || August 6, 2002 || Palomar || NEAT || — || align=right | 6.4 km || 
|-id=436 bgcolor=#d6d6d6
| 127436 ||  || — || August 6, 2002 || Palomar || NEAT || — || align=right | 4.9 km || 
|-id=437 bgcolor=#d6d6d6
| 127437 ||  || — || August 8, 2002 || Palomar || NEAT || HYG || align=right | 6.5 km || 
|-id=438 bgcolor=#d6d6d6
| 127438 ||  || — || August 8, 2002 || Palomar || NEAT || HYG || align=right | 4.6 km || 
|-id=439 bgcolor=#E9E9E9
| 127439 ||  || — || August 10, 2002 || Socorro || LINEAR || EUN || align=right | 2.3 km || 
|-id=440 bgcolor=#d6d6d6
| 127440 ||  || — || August 6, 2002 || Palomar || NEAT || HYG || align=right | 5.3 km || 
|-id=441 bgcolor=#d6d6d6
| 127441 ||  || — || August 6, 2002 || Palomar || NEAT || EOS || align=right | 7.1 km || 
|-id=442 bgcolor=#d6d6d6
| 127442 ||  || — || August 6, 2002 || Palomar || NEAT || 3:2 || align=right | 7.7 km || 
|-id=443 bgcolor=#d6d6d6
| 127443 ||  || — || August 11, 2002 || Socorro || LINEAR || TIR || align=right | 6.0 km || 
|-id=444 bgcolor=#d6d6d6
| 127444 ||  || — || August 12, 2002 || Socorro || LINEAR || ITH || align=right | 2.4 km || 
|-id=445 bgcolor=#d6d6d6
| 127445 ||  || — || August 10, 2002 || Socorro || LINEAR || — || align=right | 7.0 km || 
|-id=446 bgcolor=#E9E9E9
| 127446 ||  || — || August 12, 2002 || Socorro || LINEAR || — || align=right | 3.0 km || 
|-id=447 bgcolor=#fefefe
| 127447 ||  || — || August 12, 2002 || Socorro || LINEAR || H || align=right data-sort-value="0.93" | 930 m || 
|-id=448 bgcolor=#d6d6d6
| 127448 ||  || — || August 13, 2002 || Anderson Mesa || LONEOS || HIL3:2 || align=right | 10 km || 
|-id=449 bgcolor=#d6d6d6
| 127449 ||  || — || August 13, 2002 || Anderson Mesa || LONEOS || SHU3:2 || align=right | 8.8 km || 
|-id=450 bgcolor=#d6d6d6
| 127450 ||  || — || August 14, 2002 || Socorro || LINEAR || HYG || align=right | 5.4 km || 
|-id=451 bgcolor=#d6d6d6
| 127451 ||  || — || August 14, 2002 || Siding Spring || R. H. McNaught || TIR || align=right | 6.7 km || 
|-id=452 bgcolor=#d6d6d6
| 127452 ||  || — || August 8, 2002 || Palomar || S. F. Hönig || — || align=right | 4.1 km || 
|-id=453 bgcolor=#d6d6d6
| 127453 ||  || — || August 8, 2002 || Palomar || S. F. Hönig || — || align=right | 3.3 km || 
|-id=454 bgcolor=#d6d6d6
| 127454 ||  || — || August 8, 2002 || Palomar || NEAT || THM || align=right | 4.6 km || 
|-id=455 bgcolor=#FA8072
| 127455 ||  || — || August 18, 2002 || Socorro || LINEAR || H || align=right | 1.6 km || 
|-id=456 bgcolor=#d6d6d6
| 127456 ||  || — || August 29, 2002 || Palomar || NEAT || — || align=right | 4.1 km || 
|-id=457 bgcolor=#d6d6d6
| 127457 ||  || — || August 29, 2002 || Palomar || NEAT || HYG || align=right | 5.5 km || 
|-id=458 bgcolor=#E9E9E9
| 127458 ||  || — || August 30, 2002 || Palomar || NEAT || — || align=right | 1.8 km || 
|-id=459 bgcolor=#d6d6d6
| 127459 ||  || — || August 30, 2002 || Palomar || NEAT || AEG || align=right | 4.3 km || 
|-id=460 bgcolor=#d6d6d6
| 127460 ||  || — || August 30, 2002 || Anderson Mesa || LONEOS || EOS || align=right | 3.9 km || 
|-id=461 bgcolor=#d6d6d6
| 127461 ||  || — || August 29, 2002 || Palomar || R. Matson || LIX || align=right | 5.5 km || 
|-id=462 bgcolor=#E9E9E9
| 127462 ||  || — || August 29, 2002 || Palomar || R. Matson || — || align=right | 2.3 km || 
|-id=463 bgcolor=#d6d6d6
| 127463 ||  || — || August 16, 2002 || Palomar || NEAT || — || align=right | 3.8 km || 
|-id=464 bgcolor=#fefefe
| 127464 ||  || — || September 1, 2002 || Haleakala || NEAT || — || align=right | 1.3 km || 
|-id=465 bgcolor=#d6d6d6
| 127465 ||  || — || September 4, 2002 || Anderson Mesa || LONEOS || — || align=right | 6.6 km || 
|-id=466 bgcolor=#fefefe
| 127466 ||  || — || September 5, 2002 || Socorro || LINEAR || V || align=right | 1.3 km || 
|-id=467 bgcolor=#fefefe
| 127467 ||  || — || September 5, 2002 || Socorro || LINEAR || fast? || align=right | 1.2 km || 
|-id=468 bgcolor=#d6d6d6
| 127468 ||  || — || September 5, 2002 || Socorro || LINEAR || 7:4 || align=right | 6.6 km || 
|-id=469 bgcolor=#d6d6d6
| 127469 ||  || — || September 5, 2002 || Socorro || LINEAR || SHU3:2 || align=right | 13 km || 
|-id=470 bgcolor=#d6d6d6
| 127470 ||  || — || September 5, 2002 || Socorro || LINEAR || THM || align=right | 9.0 km || 
|-id=471 bgcolor=#fefefe
| 127471 ||  || — || September 6, 2002 || Socorro || LINEAR || V || align=right | 1.5 km || 
|-id=472 bgcolor=#d6d6d6
| 127472 ||  || — || September 5, 2002 || Socorro || LINEAR || — || align=right | 6.5 km || 
|-id=473 bgcolor=#fefefe
| 127473 ||  || — || September 9, 2002 || Drebach || Drebach Obs. || V || align=right | 1.2 km || 
|-id=474 bgcolor=#d6d6d6
| 127474 ||  || — || September 10, 2002 || Palomar || NEAT || EOS || align=right | 3.9 km || 
|-id=475 bgcolor=#fefefe
| 127475 ||  || — || September 10, 2002 || Palomar || NEAT || — || align=right | 1.5 km || 
|-id=476 bgcolor=#fefefe
| 127476 ||  || — || September 12, 2002 || Palomar || NEAT || FLO || align=right | 2.0 km || 
|-id=477 bgcolor=#E9E9E9
| 127477 Fredalee ||  ||  || September 14, 2002 || Goodricke-Pigott || R. A. Tucker || — || align=right | 1.4 km || 
|-id=478 bgcolor=#fefefe
| 127478 ||  || — || September 26, 2002 || Palomar || NEAT || H || align=right | 1.1 km || 
|-id=479 bgcolor=#fefefe
| 127479 ||  || — || September 27, 2002 || Palomar || NEAT || — || align=right | 1.7 km || 
|-id=480 bgcolor=#fefefe
| 127480 ||  || — || September 28, 2002 || Haleakala || NEAT || — || align=right | 2.7 km || 
|-id=481 bgcolor=#d6d6d6
| 127481 ||  || — || September 28, 2002 || Haleakala || NEAT || — || align=right | 5.9 km || 
|-id=482 bgcolor=#fefefe
| 127482 ||  || — || September 29, 2002 || Haleakala || NEAT || — || align=right | 1.6 km || 
|-id=483 bgcolor=#E9E9E9
| 127483 ||  || — || September 29, 2002 || Kitt Peak || Spacewatch || — || align=right | 2.1 km || 
|-id=484 bgcolor=#fefefe
| 127484 ||  || — || September 29, 2002 || Haleakala || NEAT || NYS || align=right | 1.1 km || 
|-id=485 bgcolor=#fefefe
| 127485 ||  || — || September 30, 2002 || Haleakala || NEAT || V || align=right | 1.4 km || 
|-id=486 bgcolor=#d6d6d6
| 127486 ||  || — || September 16, 2002 || Palomar || NEAT || — || align=right | 4.7 km || 
|-id=487 bgcolor=#d6d6d6
| 127487 ||  || — || October 1, 2002 || Anderson Mesa || LONEOS || THM || align=right | 7.2 km || 
|-id=488 bgcolor=#fefefe
| 127488 ||  || — || October 1, 2002 || Anderson Mesa || LONEOS || — || align=right | 1.2 km || 
|-id=489 bgcolor=#fefefe
| 127489 ||  || — || October 2, 2002 || Socorro || LINEAR || V || align=right data-sort-value="0.82" | 820 m || 
|-id=490 bgcolor=#fefefe
| 127490 ||  || — || October 2, 2002 || Socorro || LINEAR || NYS || align=right | 1.3 km || 
|-id=491 bgcolor=#fefefe
| 127491 ||  || — || October 2, 2002 || Socorro || LINEAR || — || align=right | 1.5 km || 
|-id=492 bgcolor=#fefefe
| 127492 ||  || — || October 2, 2002 || Socorro || LINEAR || — || align=right | 1.4 km || 
|-id=493 bgcolor=#fefefe
| 127493 ||  || — || October 2, 2002 || Socorro || LINEAR || — || align=right | 1.2 km || 
|-id=494 bgcolor=#fefefe
| 127494 ||  || — || October 2, 2002 || Socorro || LINEAR || FLO || align=right | 1.0 km || 
|-id=495 bgcolor=#E9E9E9
| 127495 ||  || — || October 2, 2002 || Socorro || LINEAR || — || align=right | 4.0 km || 
|-id=496 bgcolor=#E9E9E9
| 127496 ||  || — || October 2, 2002 || Socorro || LINEAR || — || align=right | 5.8 km || 
|-id=497 bgcolor=#d6d6d6
| 127497 ||  || — || October 2, 2002 || Socorro || LINEAR || HYG || align=right | 4.6 km || 
|-id=498 bgcolor=#fefefe
| 127498 ||  || — || October 2, 2002 || Socorro || LINEAR || — || align=right | 1.4 km || 
|-id=499 bgcolor=#E9E9E9
| 127499 ||  || — || October 1, 2002 || Anderson Mesa || LONEOS || — || align=right | 5.0 km || 
|-id=500 bgcolor=#fefefe
| 127500 ||  || — || October 3, 2002 || Palomar || NEAT || H || align=right data-sort-value="0.89" | 890 m || 
|}

127501–127600 

|-bgcolor=#fefefe
| 127501 ||  || — || October 3, 2002 || Palomar || NEAT || H || align=right | 1.1 km || 
|-id=502 bgcolor=#fefefe
| 127502 ||  || — || October 4, 2002 || Socorro || LINEAR || H || align=right data-sort-value="0.98" | 980 m || 
|-id=503 bgcolor=#fefefe
| 127503 ||  || — || October 4, 2002 || Socorro || LINEAR || H || align=right | 1.9 km || 
|-id=504 bgcolor=#fefefe
| 127504 ||  || — || October 6, 2002 || Socorro || LINEAR || — || align=right | 1.4 km || 
|-id=505 bgcolor=#E9E9E9
| 127505 ||  || — || October 1, 2002 || Socorro || LINEAR || — || align=right | 5.1 km || 
|-id=506 bgcolor=#d6d6d6
| 127506 ||  || — || October 3, 2002 || Palomar || NEAT || — || align=right | 4.9 km || 
|-id=507 bgcolor=#fefefe
| 127507 ||  || — || October 4, 2002 || Socorro || LINEAR || V || align=right | 1.4 km || 
|-id=508 bgcolor=#d6d6d6
| 127508 ||  || — || October 6, 2002 || Haleakala || NEAT || — || align=right | 6.9 km || 
|-id=509 bgcolor=#fefefe
| 127509 ||  || — || October 6, 2002 || Socorro || LINEAR || H || align=right | 1.3 km || 
|-id=510 bgcolor=#fefefe
| 127510 ||  || — || October 7, 2002 || Socorro || LINEAR || — || align=right | 4.7 km || 
|-id=511 bgcolor=#E9E9E9
| 127511 ||  || — || October 6, 2002 || Socorro || LINEAR || — || align=right | 1.9 km || 
|-id=512 bgcolor=#d6d6d6
| 127512 ||  || — || October 9, 2002 || Socorro || LINEAR || — || align=right | 6.6 km || 
|-id=513 bgcolor=#fefefe
| 127513 ||  || — || October 7, 2002 || Socorro || LINEAR || NYS || align=right | 1.1 km || 
|-id=514 bgcolor=#fefefe
| 127514 ||  || — || October 13, 2002 || Palomar || NEAT || H || align=right | 1.2 km || 
|-id=515 bgcolor=#E9E9E9
| 127515 Nitta ||  ||  || October 4, 2002 || Apache Point || SDSS || — || align=right | 2.9 km || 
|-id=516 bgcolor=#fefefe
| 127516 Oravetz ||  ||  || October 4, 2002 || Apache Point || SDSS || V || align=right | 1.1 km || 
|-id=517 bgcolor=#d6d6d6
| 127517 Kaikepan ||  ||  || October 10, 2002 || Apache Point || SDSS || — || align=right | 6.8 km || 
|-id=518 bgcolor=#fefefe
| 127518 ||  || — || October 30, 2002 || Palomar || NEAT || V || align=right | 1.4 km || 
|-id=519 bgcolor=#d6d6d6
| 127519 ||  || — || October 30, 2002 || Palomar || NEAT || 3:2 || align=right | 7.9 km || 
|-id=520 bgcolor=#fefefe
| 127520 ||  || — || October 31, 2002 || Palomar || NEAT || H || align=right | 1.1 km || 
|-id=521 bgcolor=#FA8072
| 127521 ||  || — || November 5, 2002 || Socorro || LINEAR || — || align=right | 2.6 km || 
|-id=522 bgcolor=#fefefe
| 127522 ||  || — || November 5, 2002 || Socorro || LINEAR || — || align=right | 3.2 km || 
|-id=523 bgcolor=#d6d6d6
| 127523 ||  || — || November 5, 2002 || Socorro || LINEAR || EOS || align=right | 3.2 km || 
|-id=524 bgcolor=#fefefe
| 127524 ||  || — || November 3, 2002 || Haleakala || NEAT || V || align=right | 1.1 km || 
|-id=525 bgcolor=#d6d6d6
| 127525 ||  || — || November 3, 2002 || Haleakala || NEAT || — || align=right | 4.8 km || 
|-id=526 bgcolor=#d6d6d6
| 127526 ||  || — || November 11, 2002 || Anderson Mesa || LONEOS || — || align=right | 6.9 km || 
|-id=527 bgcolor=#E9E9E9
| 127527 ||  || — || November 13, 2002 || Palomar || NEAT || — || align=right | 4.7 km || 
|-id=528 bgcolor=#fefefe
| 127528 ||  || — || November 12, 2002 || Socorro || LINEAR || — || align=right | 2.2 km || 
|-id=529 bgcolor=#fefefe
| 127529 ||  || — || November 13, 2002 || Palomar || NEAT || — || align=right | 1.5 km || 
|-id=530 bgcolor=#fefefe
| 127530 ||  || — || November 15, 2002 || Palomar || NEAT || H || align=right | 1.4 km || 
|-id=531 bgcolor=#fefefe
| 127531 ||  || — || November 23, 2002 || Palomar || NEAT || — || align=right | 1.6 km || 
|-id=532 bgcolor=#C2FFFF
| 127532 ||  || — || November 24, 2002 || Palomar || NEAT || L5 || align=right | 16 km || 
|-id=533 bgcolor=#E9E9E9
| 127533 ||  || — || November 24, 2002 || Palomar || NEAT || — || align=right | 2.2 km || 
|-id=534 bgcolor=#C2FFFF
| 127534 ||  || — || November 30, 2002 || Socorro || LINEAR || L5 || align=right | 18 km || 
|-id=535 bgcolor=#FA8072
| 127535 ||  || — || December 5, 2002 || Socorro || LINEAR || — || align=right | 1.5 km || 
|-id=536 bgcolor=#d6d6d6
| 127536 ||  || — || December 3, 2002 || Palomar || NEAT || — || align=right | 5.9 km || 
|-id=537 bgcolor=#fefefe
| 127537 ||  || — || December 5, 2002 || Socorro || LINEAR || — || align=right | 1.5 km || 
|-id=538 bgcolor=#fefefe
| 127538 ||  || — || December 10, 2002 || Socorro || LINEAR || H || align=right | 1.1 km || 
|-id=539 bgcolor=#fefefe
| 127539 ||  || — || December 7, 2002 || Socorro || LINEAR || H || align=right | 1.4 km || 
|-id=540 bgcolor=#fefefe
| 127540 ||  || — || December 11, 2002 || Socorro || LINEAR || H || align=right | 1.3 km || 
|-id=541 bgcolor=#fefefe
| 127541 ||  || — || December 12, 2002 || Socorro || LINEAR || H || align=right | 1.4 km || 
|-id=542 bgcolor=#fefefe
| 127542 ||  || — || December 10, 2002 || Kitt Peak || Spacewatch || ERI || align=right | 3.9 km || 
|-id=543 bgcolor=#fefefe
| 127543 ||  || — || December 11, 2002 || Socorro || LINEAR || — || align=right | 1.4 km || 
|-id=544 bgcolor=#fefefe
| 127544 ||  || — || December 11, 2002 || Socorro || LINEAR || — || align=right | 1.5 km || 
|-id=545 bgcolor=#fefefe
| 127545 Crisman ||  ||  || December 4, 2002 || Kitt Peak || R. Millis || FLO || align=right | 1.3 km || 
|-id=546 bgcolor=#C2E0FF
| 127546 ||  || — || December 4, 2002 || Kitt Peak || M. W. Buie || centaur || align=right | 170 km || 
|-id=547 bgcolor=#E9E9E9
| 127547 ||  || — || December 3, 2002 || Palomar || S. F. Hönig || RAF || align=right | 1.8 km || 
|-id=548 bgcolor=#fefefe
| 127548 || 2002 YM || — || December 27, 2002 || Anderson Mesa || LONEOS || FLO || align=right | 1.2 km || 
|-id=549 bgcolor=#fefefe
| 127549 ||  || — || December 27, 2002 || Anderson Mesa || LONEOS || — || align=right | 1.4 km || 
|-id=550 bgcolor=#fefefe
| 127550 ||  || — || December 27, 2002 || Socorro || LINEAR || H || align=right | 1.1 km || 
|-id=551 bgcolor=#fefefe
| 127551 ||  || — || December 28, 2002 || Socorro || LINEAR || H || align=right | 1.2 km || 
|-id=552 bgcolor=#FA8072
| 127552 ||  || — || December 28, 2002 || Socorro || LINEAR || — || align=right | 2.2 km || 
|-id=553 bgcolor=#E9E9E9
| 127553 ||  || — || December 31, 2002 || Socorro || LINEAR || — || align=right | 4.0 km || 
|-id=554 bgcolor=#fefefe
| 127554 ||  || — || December 31, 2002 || Socorro || LINEAR || — || align=right | 1.9 km || 
|-id=555 bgcolor=#fefefe
| 127555 ||  || — || December 31, 2002 || Socorro || LINEAR || V || align=right | 1.3 km || 
|-id=556 bgcolor=#fefefe
| 127556 ||  || — || December 31, 2002 || Kitt Peak || Spacewatch || — || align=right | 1.5 km || 
|-id=557 bgcolor=#fefefe
| 127557 ||  || — || December 31, 2002 || Socorro || LINEAR || PHO || align=right | 2.0 km || 
|-id=558 bgcolor=#fefefe
| 127558 ||  || — || December 31, 2002 || Socorro || LINEAR || V || align=right | 1.4 km || 
|-id=559 bgcolor=#fefefe
| 127559 ||  || — || December 31, 2002 || Socorro || LINEAR || MAS || align=right | 1.4 km || 
|-id=560 bgcolor=#fefefe
| 127560 ||  || — || December 31, 2002 || Socorro || LINEAR || — || align=right | 1.5 km || 
|-id=561 bgcolor=#fefefe
| 127561 ||  || — || December 31, 2002 || Socorro || LINEAR || MAS || align=right | 1.3 km || 
|-id=562 bgcolor=#fefefe
| 127562 ||  || — || December 31, 2002 || Socorro || LINEAR || — || align=right data-sort-value="0.98" | 980 m || 
|-id=563 bgcolor=#fefefe
| 127563 ||  || — || December 31, 2002 || Haleakala || NEAT || H || align=right | 1.8 km || 
|-id=564 bgcolor=#fefefe
| 127564 || 2003 AX || — || January 1, 2003 || Socorro || LINEAR || — || align=right | 1.7 km || 
|-id=565 bgcolor=#fefefe
| 127565 ||  || — || January 1, 2003 || Socorro || LINEAR || MAS || align=right | 1.4 km || 
|-id=566 bgcolor=#E9E9E9
| 127566 ||  || — || January 1, 2003 || Socorro || LINEAR || — || align=right | 5.8 km || 
|-id=567 bgcolor=#fefefe
| 127567 ||  || — || January 2, 2003 || Anderson Mesa || LONEOS || — || align=right | 2.4 km || 
|-id=568 bgcolor=#E9E9E9
| 127568 ||  || — || January 4, 2003 || Socorro || LINEAR || — || align=right | 3.0 km || 
|-id=569 bgcolor=#fefefe
| 127569 ||  || — || January 1, 2003 || Socorro || LINEAR || — || align=right | 1.5 km || 
|-id=570 bgcolor=#E9E9E9
| 127570 ||  || — || January 1, 2003 || Socorro || LINEAR || EUN || align=right | 2.4 km || 
|-id=571 bgcolor=#fefefe
| 127571 ||  || — || January 5, 2003 || Socorro || LINEAR || H || align=right | 1.3 km || 
|-id=572 bgcolor=#fefefe
| 127572 ||  || — || January 4, 2003 || Kitt Peak || Spacewatch || — || align=right | 1.4 km || 
|-id=573 bgcolor=#E9E9E9
| 127573 ||  || — || January 4, 2003 || Kitt Peak || Spacewatch || HEN || align=right | 1.9 km || 
|-id=574 bgcolor=#fefefe
| 127574 ||  || — || January 7, 2003 || Socorro || LINEAR || — || align=right | 1.4 km || 
|-id=575 bgcolor=#fefefe
| 127575 ||  || — || January 7, 2003 || Socorro || LINEAR || — || align=right | 1.8 km || 
|-id=576 bgcolor=#fefefe
| 127576 ||  || — || January 7, 2003 || Socorro || LINEAR || V || align=right | 1.3 km || 
|-id=577 bgcolor=#fefefe
| 127577 ||  || — || January 5, 2003 || Socorro || LINEAR || — || align=right data-sort-value="0.99" | 990 m || 
|-id=578 bgcolor=#fefefe
| 127578 ||  || — || January 5, 2003 || Anderson Mesa || LONEOS || — || align=right | 1.5 km || 
|-id=579 bgcolor=#d6d6d6
| 127579 ||  || — || January 5, 2003 || Socorro || LINEAR || — || align=right | 7.7 km || 
|-id=580 bgcolor=#fefefe
| 127580 ||  || — || January 5, 2003 || Socorro || LINEAR || — || align=right | 1.3 km || 
|-id=581 bgcolor=#fefefe
| 127581 ||  || — || January 5, 2003 || Socorro || LINEAR || — || align=right | 1.6 km || 
|-id=582 bgcolor=#fefefe
| 127582 ||  || — || January 7, 2003 || Socorro || LINEAR || V || align=right | 1.3 km || 
|-id=583 bgcolor=#E9E9E9
| 127583 ||  || — || January 7, 2003 || Socorro || LINEAR || MAR || align=right | 2.3 km || 
|-id=584 bgcolor=#d6d6d6
| 127584 ||  || — || January 7, 2003 || Socorro || LINEAR || — || align=right | 10 km || 
|-id=585 bgcolor=#fefefe
| 127585 ||  || — || January 10, 2003 || Socorro || LINEAR || V || align=right | 1.2 km || 
|-id=586 bgcolor=#fefefe
| 127586 ||  || — || January 11, 2003 || Socorro || LINEAR || H || align=right | 1.5 km || 
|-id=587 bgcolor=#fefefe
| 127587 ||  || — || January 8, 2003 || Socorro || LINEAR || — || align=right | 2.0 km || 
|-id=588 bgcolor=#fefefe
| 127588 ||  || — || January 2, 2003 || Socorro || LINEAR || — || align=right | 1.5 km || 
|-id=589 bgcolor=#d6d6d6
| 127589 ||  || — || January 5, 2003 || Anderson Mesa || LONEOS || — || align=right | 6.3 km || 
|-id=590 bgcolor=#E9E9E9
| 127590 ||  || — || January 25, 2003 || Anderson Mesa || LONEOS || HOF || align=right | 5.0 km || 
|-id=591 bgcolor=#fefefe
| 127591 ||  || — || January 23, 2003 || Kvistaberg || UDAS || — || align=right | 1.2 km || 
|-id=592 bgcolor=#fefefe
| 127592 ||  || — || January 25, 2003 || Anderson Mesa || LONEOS || — || align=right | 1.9 km || 
|-id=593 bgcolor=#fefefe
| 127593 ||  || — || January 26, 2003 || Anderson Mesa || LONEOS || NYS || align=right | 1.2 km || 
|-id=594 bgcolor=#d6d6d6
| 127594 ||  || — || January 26, 2003 || Anderson Mesa || LONEOS || — || align=right | 5.7 km || 
|-id=595 bgcolor=#fefefe
| 127595 ||  || — || January 26, 2003 || Anderson Mesa || LONEOS || — || align=right | 1.5 km || 
|-id=596 bgcolor=#fefefe
| 127596 ||  || — || January 26, 2003 || Haleakala || NEAT || — || align=right | 1.9 km || 
|-id=597 bgcolor=#fefefe
| 127597 ||  || — || January 26, 2003 || Haleakala || NEAT || V || align=right | 1.3 km || 
|-id=598 bgcolor=#fefefe
| 127598 ||  || — || January 26, 2003 || Haleakala || NEAT || — || align=right | 1.1 km || 
|-id=599 bgcolor=#fefefe
| 127599 ||  || — || January 27, 2003 || Socorro || LINEAR || EUT || align=right | 1.4 km || 
|-id=600 bgcolor=#fefefe
| 127600 ||  || — || January 27, 2003 || Haleakala || NEAT || — || align=right | 3.6 km || 
|}

127601–127700 

|-bgcolor=#fefefe
| 127601 ||  || — || January 26, 2003 || Haleakala || NEAT || V || align=right | 1.2 km || 
|-id=602 bgcolor=#fefefe
| 127602 ||  || — || January 26, 2003 || Haleakala || NEAT || — || align=right | 1.8 km || 
|-id=603 bgcolor=#fefefe
| 127603 ||  || — || January 27, 2003 || Socorro || LINEAR || FLO || align=right | 1.3 km || 
|-id=604 bgcolor=#fefefe
| 127604 ||  || — || January 26, 2003 || Anderson Mesa || LONEOS || — || align=right | 1.8 km || 
|-id=605 bgcolor=#fefefe
| 127605 ||  || — || January 26, 2003 || Anderson Mesa || LONEOS || FLO || align=right | 1.3 km || 
|-id=606 bgcolor=#fefefe
| 127606 ||  || — || January 26, 2003 || Haleakala || NEAT || — || align=right | 1.5 km || 
|-id=607 bgcolor=#fefefe
| 127607 ||  || — || January 27, 2003 || Socorro || LINEAR || — || align=right | 2.3 km || 
|-id=608 bgcolor=#E9E9E9
| 127608 ||  || — || January 27, 2003 || Socorro || LINEAR || MAR || align=right | 2.1 km || 
|-id=609 bgcolor=#E9E9E9
| 127609 ||  || — || January 27, 2003 || Socorro || LINEAR || EUN || align=right | 2.4 km || 
|-id=610 bgcolor=#fefefe
| 127610 ||  || — || January 26, 2003 || Haleakala || NEAT || — || align=right | 2.9 km || 
|-id=611 bgcolor=#fefefe
| 127611 ||  || — || January 27, 2003 || Anderson Mesa || LONEOS || V || align=right | 1.1 km || 
|-id=612 bgcolor=#fefefe
| 127612 ||  || — || January 27, 2003 || Socorro || LINEAR || — || align=right | 1.5 km || 
|-id=613 bgcolor=#fefefe
| 127613 ||  || — || January 27, 2003 || Socorro || LINEAR || NYS || align=right | 1.2 km || 
|-id=614 bgcolor=#fefefe
| 127614 ||  || — || January 30, 2003 || Kitt Peak || Spacewatch || — || align=right | 1.3 km || 
|-id=615 bgcolor=#fefefe
| 127615 ||  || — || January 26, 2003 || Haleakala || NEAT || — || align=right | 1.4 km || 
|-id=616 bgcolor=#E9E9E9
| 127616 ||  || — || January 27, 2003 || Socorro || LINEAR || — || align=right | 4.5 km || 
|-id=617 bgcolor=#fefefe
| 127617 ||  || — || January 27, 2003 || Anderson Mesa || LONEOS || NYS || align=right | 1.2 km || 
|-id=618 bgcolor=#fefefe
| 127618 ||  || — || January 27, 2003 || Socorro || LINEAR || V || align=right | 1.0 km || 
|-id=619 bgcolor=#fefefe
| 127619 ||  || — || January 27, 2003 || Socorro || LINEAR || — || align=right | 1.5 km || 
|-id=620 bgcolor=#fefefe
| 127620 ||  || — || January 27, 2003 || Haleakala || NEAT || — || align=right | 1.2 km || 
|-id=621 bgcolor=#fefefe
| 127621 ||  || — || January 27, 2003 || Palomar || NEAT || — || align=right | 1.3 km || 
|-id=622 bgcolor=#fefefe
| 127622 ||  || — || January 28, 2003 || Palomar || NEAT || — || align=right | 1.8 km || 
|-id=623 bgcolor=#fefefe
| 127623 ||  || — || January 30, 2003 || Haleakala || NEAT || — || align=right | 1.4 km || 
|-id=624 bgcolor=#fefefe
| 127624 ||  || — || January 30, 2003 || Haleakala || NEAT || — || align=right | 2.0 km || 
|-id=625 bgcolor=#fefefe
| 127625 ||  || — || January 28, 2003 || Socorro || LINEAR || — || align=right | 1.6 km || 
|-id=626 bgcolor=#d6d6d6
| 127626 ||  || — || January 28, 2003 || Haleakala || NEAT || — || align=right | 5.8 km || 
|-id=627 bgcolor=#E9E9E9
| 127627 ||  || — || January 31, 2003 || Socorro || LINEAR || — || align=right | 1.8 km || 
|-id=628 bgcolor=#fefefe
| 127628 ||  || — || January 31, 2003 || Socorro || LINEAR || — || align=right | 2.1 km || 
|-id=629 bgcolor=#d6d6d6
| 127629 ||  || — || January 28, 2003 || Kitt Peak || Spacewatch || EOS || align=right | 3.5 km || 
|-id=630 bgcolor=#fefefe
| 127630 ||  || — || January 28, 2003 || Socorro || LINEAR || FLO || align=right | 1.8 km || 
|-id=631 bgcolor=#E9E9E9
| 127631 ||  || — || January 28, 2003 || Socorro || LINEAR || — || align=right | 2.1 km || 
|-id=632 bgcolor=#fefefe
| 127632 ||  || — || January 30, 2003 || Anderson Mesa || LONEOS || V || align=right data-sort-value="0.99" | 990 m || 
|-id=633 bgcolor=#d6d6d6
| 127633 ||  || — || February 1, 2003 || Socorro || LINEAR || — || align=right | 6.6 km || 
|-id=634 bgcolor=#fefefe
| 127634 ||  || — || February 1, 2003 || Socorro || LINEAR || — || align=right | 1.6 km || 
|-id=635 bgcolor=#fefefe
| 127635 ||  || — || February 1, 2003 || Socorro || LINEAR || — || align=right data-sort-value="0.94" | 940 m || 
|-id=636 bgcolor=#fefefe
| 127636 ||  || — || February 1, 2003 || Socorro || LINEAR || — || align=right | 1.7 km || 
|-id=637 bgcolor=#E9E9E9
| 127637 ||  || — || February 1, 2003 || Socorro || LINEAR || — || align=right | 4.9 km || 
|-id=638 bgcolor=#fefefe
| 127638 ||  || — || February 1, 2003 || Socorro || LINEAR || FLO || align=right | 1.5 km || 
|-id=639 bgcolor=#fefefe
| 127639 ||  || — || February 1, 2003 || Socorro || LINEAR || PHO || align=right | 5.2 km || 
|-id=640 bgcolor=#d6d6d6
| 127640 ||  || — || February 1, 2003 || Haleakala || NEAT || URS || align=right | 5.8 km || 
|-id=641 bgcolor=#fefefe
| 127641 ||  || — || February 2, 2003 || Socorro || LINEAR || — || align=right | 1.8 km || 
|-id=642 bgcolor=#fefefe
| 127642 ||  || — || February 2, 2003 || Socorro || LINEAR || V || align=right | 1.3 km || 
|-id=643 bgcolor=#fefefe
| 127643 ||  || — || February 2, 2003 || Socorro || LINEAR || FLO || align=right data-sort-value="0.98" | 980 m || 
|-id=644 bgcolor=#E9E9E9
| 127644 ||  || — || February 2, 2003 || Socorro || LINEAR || MAR || align=right | 2.0 km || 
|-id=645 bgcolor=#fefefe
| 127645 ||  || — || February 3, 2003 || Anderson Mesa || LONEOS || V || align=right | 1.3 km || 
|-id=646 bgcolor=#fefefe
| 127646 ||  || — || February 5, 2003 || Haleakala || NEAT || — || align=right | 1.8 km || 
|-id=647 bgcolor=#fefefe
| 127647 ||  || — || February 6, 2003 || Socorro || LINEAR || — || align=right | 2.1 km || 
|-id=648 bgcolor=#fefefe
| 127648 ||  || — || February 7, 2003 || Kitt Peak || Spacewatch || — || align=right | 1.1 km || 
|-id=649 bgcolor=#E9E9E9
| 127649 ||  || — || February 7, 2003 || Palomar || NEAT || — || align=right | 4.1 km || 
|-id=650 bgcolor=#d6d6d6
| 127650 ||  || — || February 21, 2003 || Palomar || NEAT || EOS || align=right | 2.8 km || 
|-id=651 bgcolor=#fefefe
| 127651 ||  || — || February 22, 2003 || Desert Eagle || W. K. Y. Yeung || — || align=right | 1.4 km || 
|-id=652 bgcolor=#fefefe
| 127652 ||  || — || February 22, 2003 || Palomar || NEAT || V || align=right | 1.1 km || 
|-id=653 bgcolor=#fefefe
| 127653 ||  || — || February 22, 2003 || Palomar || NEAT || NYS || align=right | 1.2 km || 
|-id=654 bgcolor=#fefefe
| 127654 ||  || — || February 22, 2003 || Kitt Peak || Spacewatch || MAS || align=right | 1.0 km || 
|-id=655 bgcolor=#d6d6d6
| 127655 ||  || — || February 22, 2003 || Palomar || NEAT || ALA || align=right | 3.8 km || 
|-id=656 bgcolor=#fefefe
| 127656 ||  || — || February 22, 2003 || Palomar || NEAT || — || align=right | 1.6 km || 
|-id=657 bgcolor=#fefefe
| 127657 ||  || — || February 24, 2003 || Uccle || T. Pauwels || — || align=right | 1.5 km || 
|-id=658 bgcolor=#fefefe
| 127658 ||  || — || February 26, 2003 || Campo Imperatore || CINEOS || NYS || align=right | 1.1 km || 
|-id=659 bgcolor=#fefefe
| 127659 ||  || — || February 23, 2003 || Kitt Peak || Spacewatch || NYS || align=right | 1.1 km || 
|-id=660 bgcolor=#fefefe
| 127660 ||  || — || February 26, 2003 || Campo Imperatore || CINEOS || MAS || align=right | 1.2 km || 
|-id=661 bgcolor=#fefefe
| 127661 ||  || — || February 22, 2003 || Goodricke-Pigott || J. W. Kessel || FLO || align=right | 1.3 km || 
|-id=662 bgcolor=#fefefe
| 127662 ||  || — || February 25, 2003 || Haleakala || NEAT || — || align=right | 2.6 km || 
|-id=663 bgcolor=#fefefe
| 127663 ||  || — || February 24, 2003 || Haleakala || NEAT || — || align=right | 1.6 km || 
|-id=664 bgcolor=#d6d6d6
| 127664 ||  || — || February 25, 2003 || Campo Imperatore || CINEOS || — || align=right | 6.2 km || 
|-id=665 bgcolor=#fefefe
| 127665 ||  || — || February 19, 2003 || Palomar || NEAT || V || align=right | 1.4 km || 
|-id=666 bgcolor=#fefefe
| 127666 ||  || — || February 22, 2003 || Palomar || NEAT || FLO || align=right | 1.0 km || 
|-id=667 bgcolor=#E9E9E9
| 127667 ||  || — || February 22, 2003 || Palomar || NEAT || — || align=right | 5.8 km || 
|-id=668 bgcolor=#fefefe
| 127668 ||  || — || February 22, 2003 || Palomar || NEAT || — || align=right | 1.0 km || 
|-id=669 bgcolor=#fefefe
| 127669 ||  || — || March 5, 2003 || Socorro || LINEAR || NYS || align=right | 1.3 km || 
|-id=670 bgcolor=#E9E9E9
| 127670 ||  || — || March 5, 2003 || Socorro || LINEAR || — || align=right | 1.6 km || 
|-id=671 bgcolor=#d6d6d6
| 127671 ||  || — || March 6, 2003 || Palomar || NEAT || — || align=right | 5.1 km || 
|-id=672 bgcolor=#fefefe
| 127672 ||  || — || March 6, 2003 || Palomar || NEAT || — || align=right | 1.5 km || 
|-id=673 bgcolor=#fefefe
| 127673 ||  || — || March 6, 2003 || Desert Eagle || W. K. Y. Yeung || — || align=right | 1.4 km || 
|-id=674 bgcolor=#fefefe
| 127674 ||  || — || March 6, 2003 || Socorro || LINEAR || NYS || align=right | 1.3 km || 
|-id=675 bgcolor=#fefefe
| 127675 ||  || — || March 5, 2003 || Socorro || LINEAR || — || align=right | 1.3 km || 
|-id=676 bgcolor=#fefefe
| 127676 ||  || — || March 6, 2003 || Anderson Mesa || LONEOS || — || align=right | 1.4 km || 
|-id=677 bgcolor=#fefefe
| 127677 ||  || — || March 6, 2003 || Anderson Mesa || LONEOS || FLO || align=right | 1.1 km || 
|-id=678 bgcolor=#fefefe
| 127678 ||  || — || March 6, 2003 || Anderson Mesa || LONEOS || — || align=right | 1.2 km || 
|-id=679 bgcolor=#fefefe
| 127679 ||  || — || March 6, 2003 || Socorro || LINEAR || FLO || align=right | 1.2 km || 
|-id=680 bgcolor=#fefefe
| 127680 ||  || — || March 6, 2003 || Socorro || LINEAR || — || align=right | 1.5 km || 
|-id=681 bgcolor=#fefefe
| 127681 ||  || — || March 6, 2003 || Socorro || LINEAR || FLO || align=right | 2.2 km || 
|-id=682 bgcolor=#E9E9E9
| 127682 ||  || — || March 6, 2003 || Socorro || LINEAR || GEF || align=right | 2.4 km || 
|-id=683 bgcolor=#fefefe
| 127683 ||  || — || March 6, 2003 || Socorro || LINEAR || — || align=right | 1.6 km || 
|-id=684 bgcolor=#fefefe
| 127684 ||  || — || March 6, 2003 || Palomar || NEAT || — || align=right | 1.2 km || 
|-id=685 bgcolor=#fefefe
| 127685 ||  || — || March 7, 2003 || Palomar || NEAT || V || align=right | 1.1 km || 
|-id=686 bgcolor=#E9E9E9
| 127686 ||  || — || March 5, 2003 || Socorro || LINEAR || MAR || align=right | 2.4 km || 
|-id=687 bgcolor=#E9E9E9
| 127687 ||  || — || March 7, 2003 || Socorro || LINEAR || — || align=right | 1.7 km || 
|-id=688 bgcolor=#FA8072
| 127688 ||  || — || March 7, 2003 || Socorro || LINEAR || PHO || align=right | 1.6 km || 
|-id=689 bgcolor=#fefefe
| 127689 Doncapone ||  ||  || March 5, 2003 || Collepardo || U. Tagliaferri, F. Mallia || — || align=right | 1.4 km || 
|-id=690 bgcolor=#fefefe
| 127690 ||  || — || March 5, 2003 || Socorro || LINEAR || NYS || align=right | 1.3 km || 
|-id=691 bgcolor=#fefefe
| 127691 ||  || — || March 5, 2003 || Socorro || LINEAR || — || align=right | 1.4 km || 
|-id=692 bgcolor=#fefefe
| 127692 ||  || — || March 6, 2003 || Anderson Mesa || LONEOS || — || align=right | 1.5 km || 
|-id=693 bgcolor=#fefefe
| 127693 ||  || — || March 6, 2003 || Anderson Mesa || LONEOS || MAS || align=right | 1.4 km || 
|-id=694 bgcolor=#fefefe
| 127694 ||  || — || March 6, 2003 || Anderson Mesa || LONEOS || — || align=right | 1.4 km || 
|-id=695 bgcolor=#fefefe
| 127695 ||  || — || March 6, 2003 || Anderson Mesa || LONEOS || — || align=right | 1.4 km || 
|-id=696 bgcolor=#fefefe
| 127696 ||  || — || March 6, 2003 || Socorro || LINEAR || V || align=right | 1.4 km || 
|-id=697 bgcolor=#fefefe
| 127697 ||  || — || March 6, 2003 || Socorro || LINEAR || — || align=right | 1.2 km || 
|-id=698 bgcolor=#fefefe
| 127698 ||  || — || March 6, 2003 || Socorro || LINEAR || NYS || align=right | 1.6 km || 
|-id=699 bgcolor=#fefefe
| 127699 ||  || — || March 6, 2003 || Socorro || LINEAR || — || align=right | 1.8 km || 
|-id=700 bgcolor=#fefefe
| 127700 ||  || — || March 6, 2003 || Socorro || LINEAR || — || align=right | 2.9 km || 
|}

127701–127800 

|-bgcolor=#fefefe
| 127701 ||  || — || March 6, 2003 || Socorro || LINEAR || — || align=right | 1.5 km || 
|-id=702 bgcolor=#d6d6d6
| 127702 ||  || — || March 6, 2003 || Socorro || LINEAR || — || align=right | 4.2 km || 
|-id=703 bgcolor=#fefefe
| 127703 ||  || — || March 6, 2003 || Anderson Mesa || LONEOS || — || align=right | 1.1 km || 
|-id=704 bgcolor=#E9E9E9
| 127704 ||  || — || March 6, 2003 || Anderson Mesa || LONEOS || — || align=right | 2.9 km || 
|-id=705 bgcolor=#fefefe
| 127705 ||  || — || March 6, 2003 || Socorro || LINEAR || NYS || align=right | 3.2 km || 
|-id=706 bgcolor=#fefefe
| 127706 ||  || — || March 6, 2003 || Socorro || LINEAR || — || align=right | 1.5 km || 
|-id=707 bgcolor=#fefefe
| 127707 ||  || — || March 6, 2003 || Socorro || LINEAR || — || align=right | 1.5 km || 
|-id=708 bgcolor=#fefefe
| 127708 ||  || — || March 6, 2003 || Socorro || LINEAR || — || align=right | 1.5 km || 
|-id=709 bgcolor=#fefefe
| 127709 ||  || — || March 6, 2003 || Socorro || LINEAR || NYS || align=right | 1.5 km || 
|-id=710 bgcolor=#E9E9E9
| 127710 ||  || — || March 7, 2003 || Socorro || LINEAR || — || align=right | 2.1 km || 
|-id=711 bgcolor=#fefefe
| 127711 ||  || — || March 7, 2003 || Anderson Mesa || LONEOS || NYS || align=right | 1.1 km || 
|-id=712 bgcolor=#fefefe
| 127712 ||  || — || March 7, 2003 || Anderson Mesa || LONEOS || FLO || align=right | 1.9 km || 
|-id=713 bgcolor=#fefefe
| 127713 ||  || — || March 7, 2003 || Anderson Mesa || LONEOS || — || align=right data-sort-value="0.95" | 950 m || 
|-id=714 bgcolor=#fefefe
| 127714 ||  || — || March 7, 2003 || Socorro || LINEAR || FLO || align=right | 2.0 km || 
|-id=715 bgcolor=#fefefe
| 127715 ||  || — || March 7, 2003 || Socorro || LINEAR || — || align=right | 1.5 km || 
|-id=716 bgcolor=#E9E9E9
| 127716 ||  || — || March 8, 2003 || Anderson Mesa || LONEOS || — || align=right | 2.6 km || 
|-id=717 bgcolor=#E9E9E9
| 127717 ||  || — || March 8, 2003 || Anderson Mesa || LONEOS || — || align=right | 4.6 km || 
|-id=718 bgcolor=#E9E9E9
| 127718 ||  || — || March 8, 2003 || Anderson Mesa || LONEOS || — || align=right | 3.4 km || 
|-id=719 bgcolor=#fefefe
| 127719 ||  || — || March 8, 2003 || Socorro || LINEAR || PHO || align=right | 2.5 km || 
|-id=720 bgcolor=#E9E9E9
| 127720 ||  || — || March 6, 2003 || Socorro || LINEAR || — || align=right | 2.7 km || 
|-id=721 bgcolor=#fefefe
| 127721 ||  || — || March 7, 2003 || Anderson Mesa || LONEOS || — || align=right data-sort-value="0.97" | 970 m || 
|-id=722 bgcolor=#d6d6d6
| 127722 ||  || — || March 6, 2003 || Socorro || LINEAR || THM || align=right | 6.1 km || 
|-id=723 bgcolor=#fefefe
| 127723 ||  || — || March 7, 2003 || Socorro || LINEAR || FLO || align=right | 2.0 km || 
|-id=724 bgcolor=#fefefe
| 127724 ||  || — || March 7, 2003 || Socorro || LINEAR || FLO || align=right | 2.1 km || 
|-id=725 bgcolor=#fefefe
| 127725 ||  || — || March 9, 2003 || Anderson Mesa || LONEOS || — || align=right | 2.0 km || 
|-id=726 bgcolor=#fefefe
| 127726 ||  || — || March 9, 2003 || Socorro || LINEAR || V || align=right | 1.0 km || 
|-id=727 bgcolor=#E9E9E9
| 127727 ||  || — || March 10, 2003 || Anderson Mesa || LONEOS || — || align=right | 1.6 km || 
|-id=728 bgcolor=#E9E9E9
| 127728 ||  || — || March 10, 2003 || Palomar || NEAT || — || align=right | 1.9 km || 
|-id=729 bgcolor=#E9E9E9
| 127729 ||  || — || March 9, 2003 || Socorro || LINEAR || — || align=right | 4.2 km || 
|-id=730 bgcolor=#E9E9E9
| 127730 ||  || — || March 11, 2003 || Palomar || NEAT || — || align=right | 5.0 km || 
|-id=731 bgcolor=#fefefe
| 127731 ||  || — || March 8, 2003 || Socorro || LINEAR || — || align=right | 1.5 km || 
|-id=732 bgcolor=#E9E9E9
| 127732 ||  || — || March 9, 2003 || Socorro || LINEAR || — || align=right | 4.7 km || 
|-id=733 bgcolor=#fefefe
| 127733 ||  || — || March 9, 2003 || Socorro || LINEAR || — || align=right | 1.9 km || 
|-id=734 bgcolor=#fefefe
| 127734 ||  || — || March 11, 2003 || Socorro || LINEAR || — || align=right | 1.9 km || 
|-id=735 bgcolor=#fefefe
| 127735 || 2003 FU || — || March 20, 2003 || Palomar || NEAT || PHO || align=right | 2.0 km || 
|-id=736 bgcolor=#E9E9E9
| 127736 ||  || — || March 23, 2003 || Farpoint || G. Hug || — || align=right | 3.1 km || 
|-id=737 bgcolor=#E9E9E9
| 127737 ||  || — || March 26, 2003 || Campo Imperatore || CINEOS || — || align=right | 2.3 km || 
|-id=738 bgcolor=#d6d6d6
| 127738 ||  || — || March 21, 2003 || Bergisch Gladbach || W. Bickel || — || align=right | 5.2 km || 
|-id=739 bgcolor=#fefefe
| 127739 ||  || — || March 28, 2003 || Needville || L. Casady, P. Garossino || — || align=right | 1.0 km || 
|-id=740 bgcolor=#E9E9E9
| 127740 ||  || — || March 22, 2003 || Palomar || NEAT || EUN || align=right | 2.5 km || 
|-id=741 bgcolor=#E9E9E9
| 127741 ||  || — || March 23, 2003 || Kitt Peak || Spacewatch || AGN || align=right | 2.1 km || 
|-id=742 bgcolor=#d6d6d6
| 127742 ||  || — || March 24, 2003 || Kitt Peak || Spacewatch || — || align=right | 6.1 km || 
|-id=743 bgcolor=#E9E9E9
| 127743 ||  || — || March 22, 2003 || Palomar || NEAT || — || align=right | 4.7 km || 
|-id=744 bgcolor=#fefefe
| 127744 ||  || — || March 22, 2003 || Palomar || NEAT || — || align=right | 1.7 km || 
|-id=745 bgcolor=#fefefe
| 127745 ||  || — || March 23, 2003 || Kitt Peak || Spacewatch || — || align=right | 1.7 km || 
|-id=746 bgcolor=#E9E9E9
| 127746 ||  || — || March 23, 2003 || Kitt Peak || Spacewatch || AGN || align=right | 2.4 km || 
|-id=747 bgcolor=#fefefe
| 127747 ||  || — || March 23, 2003 || Kitt Peak || Spacewatch || — || align=right | 1.4 km || 
|-id=748 bgcolor=#fefefe
| 127748 ||  || — || March 23, 2003 || Kitt Peak || Spacewatch || — || align=right | 1.3 km || 
|-id=749 bgcolor=#fefefe
| 127749 ||  || — || March 23, 2003 || Haleakala || NEAT || — || align=right | 2.6 km || 
|-id=750 bgcolor=#fefefe
| 127750 ||  || — || March 23, 2003 || Kvistaberg || UDAS || — || align=right | 1.5 km || 
|-id=751 bgcolor=#fefefe
| 127751 ||  || — || March 23, 2003 || Palomar || NEAT || FLO || align=right | 1.3 km || 
|-id=752 bgcolor=#E9E9E9
| 127752 ||  || — || March 23, 2003 || Palomar || NEAT || — || align=right | 4.7 km || 
|-id=753 bgcolor=#fefefe
| 127753 ||  || — || March 23, 2003 || Palomar || NEAT || — || align=right | 1.5 km || 
|-id=754 bgcolor=#fefefe
| 127754 ||  || — || March 23, 2003 || Kitt Peak || Spacewatch || MAS || align=right | 1.1 km || 
|-id=755 bgcolor=#fefefe
| 127755 ||  || — || March 24, 2003 || Kitt Peak || Spacewatch || NYS || align=right | 2.2 km || 
|-id=756 bgcolor=#fefefe
| 127756 ||  || — || March 24, 2003 || Haleakala || NEAT || V || align=right | 1.1 km || 
|-id=757 bgcolor=#d6d6d6
| 127757 ||  || — || March 24, 2003 || Haleakala || NEAT || — || align=right | 5.5 km || 
|-id=758 bgcolor=#fefefe
| 127758 ||  || — || March 25, 2003 || Haleakala || NEAT || ERI || align=right | 2.5 km || 
|-id=759 bgcolor=#fefefe
| 127759 ||  || — || March 23, 2003 || Kitt Peak || Spacewatch || MAS || align=right | 1.4 km || 
|-id=760 bgcolor=#E9E9E9
| 127760 ||  || — || March 23, 2003 || Kitt Peak || Spacewatch || — || align=right | 2.8 km || 
|-id=761 bgcolor=#fefefe
| 127761 ||  || — || March 23, 2003 || Kitt Peak || Spacewatch || MAS || align=right data-sort-value="0.95" | 950 m || 
|-id=762 bgcolor=#E9E9E9
| 127762 ||  || — || March 23, 2003 || Kitt Peak || Spacewatch || — || align=right | 1.3 km || 
|-id=763 bgcolor=#fefefe
| 127763 ||  || — || March 23, 2003 || Kitt Peak || Spacewatch || NYS || align=right | 1.5 km || 
|-id=764 bgcolor=#d6d6d6
| 127764 ||  || — || March 24, 2003 || Kitt Peak || Spacewatch || — || align=right | 4.0 km || 
|-id=765 bgcolor=#fefefe
| 127765 ||  || — || March 24, 2003 || Kitt Peak || Spacewatch || NYS || align=right | 3.2 km || 
|-id=766 bgcolor=#fefefe
| 127766 ||  || — || March 26, 2003 || Kitt Peak || Spacewatch || — || align=right | 1.1 km || 
|-id=767 bgcolor=#fefefe
| 127767 ||  || — || March 23, 2003 || Kitt Peak || Spacewatch || NYS || align=right | 1.1 km || 
|-id=768 bgcolor=#fefefe
| 127768 ||  || — || March 23, 2003 || Haleakala || NEAT || — || align=right | 1.5 km || 
|-id=769 bgcolor=#E9E9E9
| 127769 ||  || — || March 24, 2003 || Kitt Peak || Spacewatch || — || align=right | 3.7 km || 
|-id=770 bgcolor=#fefefe
| 127770 ||  || — || March 24, 2003 || Kitt Peak || Spacewatch || — || align=right | 1.6 km || 
|-id=771 bgcolor=#E9E9E9
| 127771 ||  || — || March 25, 2003 || Palomar || NEAT || — || align=right | 5.2 km || 
|-id=772 bgcolor=#E9E9E9
| 127772 ||  || — || March 25, 2003 || Palomar || NEAT || — || align=right | 1.7 km || 
|-id=773 bgcolor=#d6d6d6
| 127773 ||  || — || March 25, 2003 || Palomar || NEAT || — || align=right | 11 km || 
|-id=774 bgcolor=#fefefe
| 127774 ||  || — || March 25, 2003 || Haleakala || NEAT || — || align=right | 1.9 km || 
|-id=775 bgcolor=#E9E9E9
| 127775 ||  || — || March 25, 2003 || Palomar || NEAT || — || align=right | 2.2 km || 
|-id=776 bgcolor=#E9E9E9
| 127776 ||  || — || March 25, 2003 || Palomar || NEAT || — || align=right | 2.9 km || 
|-id=777 bgcolor=#E9E9E9
| 127777 ||  || — || March 25, 2003 || Palomar || NEAT || MAR || align=right | 1.9 km || 
|-id=778 bgcolor=#E9E9E9
| 127778 ||  || — || March 25, 2003 || Palomar || NEAT || — || align=right | 5.0 km || 
|-id=779 bgcolor=#E9E9E9
| 127779 ||  || — || March 25, 2003 || Haleakala || NEAT || — || align=right | 1.7 km || 
|-id=780 bgcolor=#E9E9E9
| 127780 ||  || — || March 25, 2003 || Haleakala || NEAT || — || align=right | 3.2 km || 
|-id=781 bgcolor=#E9E9E9
| 127781 ||  || — || March 26, 2003 || Palomar || NEAT || — || align=right | 2.9 km || 
|-id=782 bgcolor=#fefefe
| 127782 ||  || — || March 26, 2003 || Palomar || NEAT || NYS || align=right | 3.0 km || 
|-id=783 bgcolor=#E9E9E9
| 127783 ||  || — || March 26, 2003 || Palomar || NEAT || PAD || align=right | 3.1 km || 
|-id=784 bgcolor=#fefefe
| 127784 ||  || — || March 26, 2003 || Palomar || NEAT || NYS || align=right | 1.4 km || 
|-id=785 bgcolor=#fefefe
| 127785 ||  || — || March 26, 2003 || Palomar || NEAT || V || align=right | 1.4 km || 
|-id=786 bgcolor=#fefefe
| 127786 ||  || — || March 26, 2003 || Palomar || NEAT || NYS || align=right | 1.1 km || 
|-id=787 bgcolor=#fefefe
| 127787 ||  || — || March 26, 2003 || Palomar || NEAT || NYS || align=right | 1.1 km || 
|-id=788 bgcolor=#fefefe
| 127788 ||  || — || March 26, 2003 || Palomar || NEAT || NYS || align=right | 3.3 km || 
|-id=789 bgcolor=#fefefe
| 127789 ||  || — || March 26, 2003 || Palomar || NEAT || V || align=right | 1.1 km || 
|-id=790 bgcolor=#fefefe
| 127790 ||  || — || March 26, 2003 || Palomar || NEAT || FLO || align=right | 1.9 km || 
|-id=791 bgcolor=#d6d6d6
| 127791 ||  || — || March 26, 2003 || Palomar || NEAT || — || align=right | 5.5 km || 
|-id=792 bgcolor=#fefefe
| 127792 ||  || — || March 26, 2003 || Palomar || NEAT || — || align=right | 1.2 km || 
|-id=793 bgcolor=#fefefe
| 127793 ||  || — || March 26, 2003 || Haleakala || NEAT || NYS || align=right | 1.2 km || 
|-id=794 bgcolor=#fefefe
| 127794 ||  || — || March 26, 2003 || Haleakala || NEAT || — || align=right | 1.4 km || 
|-id=795 bgcolor=#fefefe
| 127795 ||  || — || March 26, 2003 || Palomar || NEAT || V || align=right | 1.7 km || 
|-id=796 bgcolor=#fefefe
| 127796 ||  || — || March 26, 2003 || Palomar || NEAT || — || align=right | 1.7 km || 
|-id=797 bgcolor=#E9E9E9
| 127797 ||  || — || March 26, 2003 || Haleakala || NEAT || — || align=right | 4.6 km || 
|-id=798 bgcolor=#fefefe
| 127798 ||  || — || March 27, 2003 || Palomar || NEAT || — || align=right | 1.3 km || 
|-id=799 bgcolor=#fefefe
| 127799 ||  || — || March 27, 2003 || Palomar || NEAT || — || align=right | 1.3 km || 
|-id=800 bgcolor=#fefefe
| 127800 ||  || — || March 27, 2003 || Palomar || NEAT || — || align=right | 1.3 km || 
|}

127801–127900 

|-bgcolor=#fefefe
| 127801 ||  || — || March 27, 2003 || Palomar || NEAT || — || align=right | 1.8 km || 
|-id=802 bgcolor=#fefefe
| 127802 ||  || — || March 27, 2003 || Palomar || NEAT || — || align=right | 1.2 km || 
|-id=803 bgcolor=#E9E9E9
| 127803 Johnvaneepoel ||  ||  || March 27, 2003 || Catalina || CSS || MAR || align=right | 1.8 km || 
|-id=804 bgcolor=#fefefe
| 127804 ||  || — || March 27, 2003 || Socorro || LINEAR || — || align=right | 1.5 km || 
|-id=805 bgcolor=#E9E9E9
| 127805 ||  || — || March 27, 2003 || Socorro || LINEAR || — || align=right | 4.9 km || 
|-id=806 bgcolor=#d6d6d6
| 127806 ||  || — || March 27, 2003 || Socorro || LINEAR || DUR || align=right | 6.1 km || 
|-id=807 bgcolor=#E9E9E9
| 127807 ||  || — || March 27, 2003 || Palomar || NEAT || — || align=right | 3.8 km || 
|-id=808 bgcolor=#fefefe
| 127808 ||  || — || March 27, 2003 || Palomar || NEAT || FLO || align=right | 1.9 km || 
|-id=809 bgcolor=#fefefe
| 127809 ||  || — || March 27, 2003 || Palomar || NEAT || — || align=right | 1.9 km || 
|-id=810 bgcolor=#fefefe
| 127810 Michaelwright ||  ||  || March 28, 2003 || Catalina || CSS || — || align=right | 1.4 km || 
|-id=811 bgcolor=#E9E9E9
| 127811 ||  || — || March 28, 2003 || Anderson Mesa || LONEOS || — || align=right | 1.8 km || 
|-id=812 bgcolor=#fefefe
| 127812 ||  || — || March 28, 2003 || Anderson Mesa || LONEOS || SUL || align=right | 4.1 km || 
|-id=813 bgcolor=#fefefe
| 127813 ||  || — || March 28, 2003 || Kitt Peak || Spacewatch || — || align=right | 1.3 km || 
|-id=814 bgcolor=#E9E9E9
| 127814 ||  || — || March 28, 2003 || Kitt Peak || Spacewatch || DOR || align=right | 6.3 km || 
|-id=815 bgcolor=#fefefe
| 127815 ||  || — || March 28, 2003 || Kitt Peak || Spacewatch || — || align=right | 1.8 km || 
|-id=816 bgcolor=#fefefe
| 127816 ||  || — || March 28, 2003 || Kitt Peak || Spacewatch || FLO || align=right | 1.3 km || 
|-id=817 bgcolor=#d6d6d6
| 127817 ||  || — || March 28, 2003 || Kitt Peak || Spacewatch || — || align=right | 3.1 km || 
|-id=818 bgcolor=#fefefe
| 127818 ||  || — || March 28, 2003 || Kitt Peak || Spacewatch || FLO || align=right | 1.5 km || 
|-id=819 bgcolor=#fefefe
| 127819 ||  || — || March 29, 2003 || Anderson Mesa || LONEOS || — || align=right | 1.3 km || 
|-id=820 bgcolor=#fefefe
| 127820 ||  || — || March 29, 2003 || Anderson Mesa || LONEOS || — || align=right | 1.4 km || 
|-id=821 bgcolor=#fefefe
| 127821 ||  || — || March 29, 2003 || Anderson Mesa || LONEOS || FLO || align=right | 1.2 km || 
|-id=822 bgcolor=#fefefe
| 127822 ||  || — || March 29, 2003 || Anderson Mesa || LONEOS || — || align=right | 2.8 km || 
|-id=823 bgcolor=#d6d6d6
| 127823 ||  || — || March 29, 2003 || Anderson Mesa || LONEOS || — || align=right | 3.9 km || 
|-id=824 bgcolor=#fefefe
| 127824 ||  || — || March 29, 2003 || Anderson Mesa || LONEOS || NYS || align=right | 1.2 km || 
|-id=825 bgcolor=#d6d6d6
| 127825 ||  || — || March 29, 2003 || Anderson Mesa || LONEOS || TIR || align=right | 3.5 km || 
|-id=826 bgcolor=#fefefe
| 127826 ||  || — || March 29, 2003 || Anderson Mesa || LONEOS || — || align=right | 1.5 km || 
|-id=827 bgcolor=#fefefe
| 127827 ||  || — || March 29, 2003 || Anderson Mesa || LONEOS || FLO || align=right | 1.3 km || 
|-id=828 bgcolor=#fefefe
| 127828 ||  || — || March 29, 2003 || Anderson Mesa || LONEOS || — || align=right | 1.6 km || 
|-id=829 bgcolor=#E9E9E9
| 127829 ||  || — || March 29, 2003 || Anderson Mesa || LONEOS || HNS || align=right | 2.2 km || 
|-id=830 bgcolor=#fefefe
| 127830 ||  || — || March 29, 2003 || Anderson Mesa || LONEOS || — || align=right | 1.8 km || 
|-id=831 bgcolor=#fefefe
| 127831 ||  || — || March 29, 2003 || Anderson Mesa || LONEOS || V || align=right | 1.3 km || 
|-id=832 bgcolor=#fefefe
| 127832 ||  || — || March 31, 2003 || Kitt Peak || Spacewatch || FLO || align=right data-sort-value="0.96" | 960 m || 
|-id=833 bgcolor=#fefefe
| 127833 ||  || — || March 24, 2003 || Kitt Peak || Spacewatch || — || align=right | 1.4 km || 
|-id=834 bgcolor=#fefefe
| 127834 ||  || — || March 25, 2003 || Haleakala || NEAT || — || align=right | 1.4 km || 
|-id=835 bgcolor=#fefefe
| 127835 ||  || — || March 26, 2003 || Kitt Peak || Spacewatch || NYSfast? || align=right | 1.2 km || 
|-id=836 bgcolor=#fefefe
| 127836 ||  || — || March 27, 2003 || Anderson Mesa || LONEOS || V || align=right | 1.4 km || 
|-id=837 bgcolor=#fefefe
| 127837 ||  || — || March 30, 2003 || Socorro || LINEAR || — || align=right | 1.6 km || 
|-id=838 bgcolor=#E9E9E9
| 127838 ||  || — || March 30, 2003 || Socorro || LINEAR || — || align=right | 3.8 km || 
|-id=839 bgcolor=#fefefe
| 127839 ||  || — || March 31, 2003 || Socorro || LINEAR || FLO || align=right data-sort-value="0.94" | 940 m || 
|-id=840 bgcolor=#E9E9E9
| 127840 ||  || — || March 30, 2003 || Socorro || LINEAR || — || align=right | 3.1 km || 
|-id=841 bgcolor=#d6d6d6
| 127841 ||  || — || March 31, 2003 || Anderson Mesa || LONEOS || — || align=right | 3.4 km || 
|-id=842 bgcolor=#fefefe
| 127842 ||  || — || March 31, 2003 || Anderson Mesa || LONEOS || — || align=right | 1.3 km || 
|-id=843 bgcolor=#fefefe
| 127843 ||  || — || March 31, 2003 || Anderson Mesa || LONEOS || — || align=right | 1.7 km || 
|-id=844 bgcolor=#E9E9E9
| 127844 ||  || — || March 31, 2003 || Anderson Mesa || LONEOS || — || align=right | 4.2 km || 
|-id=845 bgcolor=#fefefe
| 127845 ||  || — || March 30, 2003 || Anderson Mesa || LONEOS || — || align=right | 2.7 km || 
|-id=846 bgcolor=#C2FFFF
| 127846 ||  || — || March 31, 2003 || Anderson Mesa || LONEOS || L4ERY || align=right | 17 km || 
|-id=847 bgcolor=#fefefe
| 127847 ||  || — || March 31, 2003 || Socorro || LINEAR || FLO || align=right data-sort-value="0.92" | 920 m || 
|-id=848 bgcolor=#fefefe
| 127848 ||  || — || March 31, 2003 || Socorro || LINEAR || FLO || align=right | 3.5 km || 
|-id=849 bgcolor=#fefefe
| 127849 ||  || — || March 31, 2003 || Socorro || LINEAR || — || align=right | 1.4 km || 
|-id=850 bgcolor=#fefefe
| 127850 ||  || — || March 31, 2003 || Socorro || LINEAR || — || align=right | 1.1 km || 
|-id=851 bgcolor=#fefefe
| 127851 ||  || — || March 30, 2003 || Socorro || LINEAR || NYS || align=right | 1.3 km || 
|-id=852 bgcolor=#fefefe
| 127852 ||  || — || March 30, 2003 || Kitt Peak || Spacewatch || NYS || align=right | 1.0 km || 
|-id=853 bgcolor=#fefefe
| 127853 ||  || — || March 30, 2003 || Kitt Peak || Spacewatch || — || align=right | 3.9 km || 
|-id=854 bgcolor=#fefefe
| 127854 ||  || — || March 31, 2003 || Socorro || LINEAR || NYS || align=right | 1.1 km || 
|-id=855 bgcolor=#E9E9E9
| 127855 ||  || — || March 31, 2003 || Kitt Peak || Spacewatch || — || align=right | 1.6 km || 
|-id=856 bgcolor=#fefefe
| 127856 ||  || — || March 31, 2003 || Kitt Peak || Spacewatch || FLO || align=right | 1.4 km || 
|-id=857 bgcolor=#fefefe
| 127857 ||  || — || March 31, 2003 || Socorro || LINEAR || FLO || align=right | 1.3 km || 
|-id=858 bgcolor=#d6d6d6
| 127858 ||  || — || March 31, 2003 || Kitt Peak || Spacewatch || HYG || align=right | 6.0 km || 
|-id=859 bgcolor=#fefefe
| 127859 ||  || — || March 31, 2003 || Socorro || LINEAR || — || align=right | 1.5 km || 
|-id=860 bgcolor=#E9E9E9
| 127860 ||  || — || March 31, 2003 || Socorro || LINEAR || — || align=right | 2.9 km || 
|-id=861 bgcolor=#fefefe
| 127861 ||  || — || March 22, 2003 || Palomar || NEAT || V || align=right | 1.2 km || 
|-id=862 bgcolor=#fefefe
| 127862 ||  || — || March 23, 2003 || Kitt Peak || Spacewatch || — || align=right | 1.1 km || 
|-id=863 bgcolor=#fefefe
| 127863 ||  || — || March 25, 2003 || Palomar || NEAT || — || align=right | 1.7 km || 
|-id=864 bgcolor=#E9E9E9
| 127864 ||  || — || March 26, 2003 || Anderson Mesa || LONEOS || — || align=right | 2.7 km || 
|-id=865 bgcolor=#fefefe
| 127865 ||  || — || March 26, 2003 || Anderson Mesa || LONEOS || MAS || align=right | 1.2 km || 
|-id=866 bgcolor=#E9E9E9
| 127866 ||  || — || March 26, 2003 || Anderson Mesa || LONEOS || — || align=right | 1.7 km || 
|-id=867 bgcolor=#fefefe
| 127867 ||  || — || March 26, 2003 || Anderson Mesa || LONEOS || MAS || align=right | 1.2 km || 
|-id=868 bgcolor=#fefefe
| 127868 ||  || — || March 26, 2003 || Anderson Mesa || LONEOS || NYS || align=right | 1.1 km || 
|-id=869 bgcolor=#E9E9E9
| 127869 ||  || — || March 25, 2003 || Anderson Mesa || LONEOS || EUN || align=right | 2.5 km || 
|-id=870 bgcolor=#E9E9E9
| 127870 Vigo ||  ||  || March 24, 2003 || Mérida || I. R. Ferrín, C. Leal || GAL || align=right | 3.2 km || 
|-id=871 bgcolor=#C2E0FF
| 127871 ||  || — || March 31, 2003 || Kitt Peak || M. W. Buie || res4:5 || align=right | 146 km || 
|-id=872 bgcolor=#fefefe
| 127872 || 2003 GV || — || April 4, 2003 || Socorro || LINEAR || — || align=right | 1.5 km || 
|-id=873 bgcolor=#fefefe
| 127873 ||  || — || April 1, 2003 || Haleakala || NEAT || V || align=right | 1.5 km || 
|-id=874 bgcolor=#fefefe
| 127874 ||  || — || April 1, 2003 || Haleakala || NEAT || — || align=right | 2.1 km || 
|-id=875 bgcolor=#E9E9E9
| 127875 ||  || — || April 1, 2003 || Haleakala || NEAT || — || align=right | 3.2 km || 
|-id=876 bgcolor=#E9E9E9
| 127876 ||  || — || April 1, 2003 || Socorro || LINEAR || — || align=right | 1.8 km || 
|-id=877 bgcolor=#fefefe
| 127877 ||  || — || April 1, 2003 || Socorro || LINEAR || — || align=right | 1.3 km || 
|-id=878 bgcolor=#fefefe
| 127878 ||  || — || April 1, 2003 || Socorro || LINEAR || — || align=right | 2.4 km || 
|-id=879 bgcolor=#fefefe
| 127879 ||  || — || April 1, 2003 || Socorro || LINEAR || — || align=right | 1.6 km || 
|-id=880 bgcolor=#fefefe
| 127880 ||  || — || April 1, 2003 || Socorro || LINEAR || — || align=right | 1.2 km || 
|-id=881 bgcolor=#fefefe
| 127881 ||  || — || April 1, 2003 || Socorro || LINEAR || NYS || align=right | 2.9 km || 
|-id=882 bgcolor=#fefefe
| 127882 ||  || — || April 1, 2003 || Socorro || LINEAR || — || align=right | 1.4 km || 
|-id=883 bgcolor=#fefefe
| 127883 ||  || — || April 1, 2003 || Socorro || LINEAR || FLO || align=right | 2.0 km || 
|-id=884 bgcolor=#fefefe
| 127884 ||  || — || April 2, 2003 || Socorro || LINEAR || NYS || align=right | 1.3 km || 
|-id=885 bgcolor=#fefefe
| 127885 ||  || — || April 2, 2003 || Socorro || LINEAR || — || align=right | 1.6 km || 
|-id=886 bgcolor=#fefefe
| 127886 ||  || — || April 2, 2003 || Socorro || LINEAR || — || align=right | 1.6 km || 
|-id=887 bgcolor=#fefefe
| 127887 ||  || — || April 2, 2003 || Haleakala || NEAT || — || align=right | 3.2 km || 
|-id=888 bgcolor=#fefefe
| 127888 ||  || — || April 1, 2003 || Socorro || LINEAR || FLO || align=right | 1.1 km || 
|-id=889 bgcolor=#fefefe
| 127889 ||  || — || April 1, 2003 || Socorro || LINEAR || — || align=right | 1.5 km || 
|-id=890 bgcolor=#fefefe
| 127890 ||  || — || April 2, 2003 || Socorro || LINEAR || FLO || align=right | 1.9 km || 
|-id=891 bgcolor=#fefefe
| 127891 ||  || — || April 2, 2003 || Socorro || LINEAR || — || align=right | 1.3 km || 
|-id=892 bgcolor=#E9E9E9
| 127892 ||  || — || April 2, 2003 || Socorro || LINEAR || — || align=right | 3.8 km || 
|-id=893 bgcolor=#E9E9E9
| 127893 ||  || — || April 2, 2003 || Socorro || LINEAR || — || align=right | 4.3 km || 
|-id=894 bgcolor=#E9E9E9
| 127894 ||  || — || April 1, 2003 || Socorro || LINEAR || — || align=right | 1.7 km || 
|-id=895 bgcolor=#fefefe
| 127895 ||  || — || April 1, 2003 || Socorro || LINEAR || — || align=right | 1.3 km || 
|-id=896 bgcolor=#E9E9E9
| 127896 ||  || — || April 3, 2003 || Haleakala || NEAT || MAR || align=right | 1.8 km || 
|-id=897 bgcolor=#d6d6d6
| 127897 ||  || — || April 4, 2003 || Haleakala || NEAT || — || align=right | 5.5 km || 
|-id=898 bgcolor=#fefefe
| 127898 ||  || — || April 2, 2003 || Socorro || LINEAR || — || align=right | 1.8 km || 
|-id=899 bgcolor=#E9E9E9
| 127899 ||  || — || April 2, 2003 || Haleakala || NEAT || — || align=right | 5.3 km || 
|-id=900 bgcolor=#fefefe
| 127900 ||  || — || April 3, 2003 || Haleakala || NEAT || — || align=right | 3.0 km || 
|}

127901–128000 

|-bgcolor=#fefefe
| 127901 ||  || — || April 6, 2003 || Desert Eagle || W. K. Y. Yeung || — || align=right | 1.9 km || 
|-id=902 bgcolor=#fefefe
| 127902 ||  || — || April 6, 2003 || Desert Eagle || W. K. Y. Yeung || — || align=right | 2.4 km || 
|-id=903 bgcolor=#fefefe
| 127903 ||  || — || April 3, 2003 || Anderson Mesa || LONEOS || — || align=right | 1.8 km || 
|-id=904 bgcolor=#E9E9E9
| 127904 ||  || — || April 3, 2003 || Anderson Mesa || LONEOS || — || align=right | 2.5 km || 
|-id=905 bgcolor=#fefefe
| 127905 ||  || — || April 4, 2003 || Anderson Mesa || LONEOS || — || align=right | 3.7 km || 
|-id=906 bgcolor=#fefefe
| 127906 ||  || — || April 6, 2003 || Socorro || LINEAR || — || align=right | 3.1 km || 
|-id=907 bgcolor=#fefefe
| 127907 ||  || — || April 6, 2003 || Kitt Peak || Spacewatch || — || align=right | 1.4 km || 
|-id=908 bgcolor=#d6d6d6
| 127908 ||  || — || April 4, 2003 || Kitt Peak || Spacewatch || — || align=right | 3.1 km || 
|-id=909 bgcolor=#fefefe
| 127909 ||  || — || April 4, 2003 || Kitt Peak || Spacewatch || — || align=right data-sort-value="0.73" | 730 m || 
|-id=910 bgcolor=#d6d6d6
| 127910 ||  || — || April 4, 2003 || Kitt Peak || Spacewatch || — || align=right | 5.0 km || 
|-id=911 bgcolor=#d6d6d6
| 127911 ||  || — || April 6, 2003 || Kitt Peak || Spacewatch || — || align=right | 3.5 km || 
|-id=912 bgcolor=#fefefe
| 127912 ||  || — || April 4, 2003 || Kitt Peak || Spacewatch || — || align=right | 1.4 km || 
|-id=913 bgcolor=#fefefe
| 127913 ||  || — || April 5, 2003 || Kitt Peak || Spacewatch || V || align=right | 1.7 km || 
|-id=914 bgcolor=#fefefe
| 127914 ||  || — || April 7, 2003 || Socorro || LINEAR || — || align=right | 1.5 km || 
|-id=915 bgcolor=#E9E9E9
| 127915 ||  || — || April 8, 2003 || Socorro || LINEAR || — || align=right | 2.7 km || 
|-id=916 bgcolor=#E9E9E9
| 127916 ||  || — || April 8, 2003 || Socorro || LINEAR || — || align=right | 4.3 km || 
|-id=917 bgcolor=#E9E9E9
| 127917 ||  || — || April 8, 2003 || Kitt Peak || Spacewatch || — || align=right | 4.4 km || 
|-id=918 bgcolor=#fefefe
| 127918 ||  || — || April 8, 2003 || Socorro || LINEAR || V || align=right | 1.3 km || 
|-id=919 bgcolor=#fefefe
| 127919 ||  || — || April 9, 2003 || Socorro || LINEAR || V || align=right | 1.4 km || 
|-id=920 bgcolor=#d6d6d6
| 127920 ||  || — || April 9, 2003 || Socorro || LINEAR || TIR || align=right | 6.4 km || 
|-id=921 bgcolor=#d6d6d6
| 127921 ||  || — || April 9, 2003 || Socorro || LINEAR || ALA || align=right | 7.1 km || 
|-id=922 bgcolor=#d6d6d6
| 127922 ||  || — || April 9, 2003 || Palomar || NEAT || — || align=right | 9.6 km || 
|-id=923 bgcolor=#E9E9E9
| 127923 ||  || — || April 8, 2003 || Palomar || NEAT || — || align=right | 1.7 km || 
|-id=924 bgcolor=#fefefe
| 127924 ||  || — || April 7, 2003 || Kitt Peak || Spacewatch || FLO || align=right data-sort-value="0.85" | 850 m || 
|-id=925 bgcolor=#E9E9E9
| 127925 ||  || — || April 7, 2003 || Palomar || NEAT || — || align=right | 2.6 km || 
|-id=926 bgcolor=#E9E9E9
| 127926 ||  || — || April 9, 2003 || Palomar || NEAT || — || align=right | 2.5 km || 
|-id=927 bgcolor=#E9E9E9
| 127927 ||  || — || April 10, 2003 || Kitt Peak || Spacewatch || — || align=right | 1.6 km || 
|-id=928 bgcolor=#E9E9E9
| 127928 ||  || — || April 10, 2003 || Kitt Peak || Spacewatch || — || align=right | 3.0 km || 
|-id=929 bgcolor=#fefefe
| 127929 ||  || — || April 9, 2003 || Kingsnake || J. V. McClusky || — || align=right | 1.9 km || 
|-id=930 bgcolor=#E9E9E9
| 127930 ||  || — || April 5, 2003 || Anderson Mesa || LONEOS || — || align=right | 2.8 km || 
|-id=931 bgcolor=#E9E9E9
| 127931 ||  || — || April 4, 2003 || Kitt Peak || Spacewatch || — || align=right | 1.6 km || 
|-id=932 bgcolor=#E9E9E9
| 127932 ||  || — || April 21, 2003 || Catalina || CSS || — || align=right | 3.3 km || 
|-id=933 bgcolor=#fefefe
| 127933 Shaunoborn ||  ||  || April 21, 2003 || Catalina || CSS || — || align=right | 1.4 km || 
|-id=934 bgcolor=#fefefe
| 127934 ||  || — || April 22, 2003 || Siding Spring || R. H. McNaught || — || align=right | 1.3 km || 
|-id=935 bgcolor=#E9E9E9
| 127935 Reedmckenna ||  ||  || April 21, 2003 || Catalina || CSS || — || align=right | 2.0 km || 
|-id=936 bgcolor=#fefefe
| 127936 ||  || — || April 23, 2003 || Campo Imperatore || CINEOS || V || align=right | 1.3 km || 
|-id=937 bgcolor=#d6d6d6
| 127937 ||  || — || April 23, 2003 || Reedy Creek || J. Broughton || EOS || align=right | 3.6 km || 
|-id=938 bgcolor=#FA8072
| 127938 ||  || — || April 25, 2003 || Socorro || LINEAR || — || align=right | 1.4 km || 
|-id=939 bgcolor=#E9E9E9
| 127939 ||  || — || April 24, 2003 || Anderson Mesa || LONEOS || — || align=right | 1.3 km || 
|-id=940 bgcolor=#d6d6d6
| 127940 ||  || — || April 24, 2003 || Anderson Mesa || LONEOS || EOS || align=right | 3.3 km || 
|-id=941 bgcolor=#E9E9E9
| 127941 ||  || — || April 24, 2003 || Anderson Mesa || LONEOS || — || align=right | 3.2 km || 
|-id=942 bgcolor=#fefefe
| 127942 ||  || — || April 24, 2003 || Anderson Mesa || LONEOS || — || align=right | 1.0 km || 
|-id=943 bgcolor=#fefefe
| 127943 ||  || — || April 24, 2003 || Anderson Mesa || LONEOS || — || align=right | 1.0 km || 
|-id=944 bgcolor=#E9E9E9
| 127944 ||  || — || April 24, 2003 || Anderson Mesa || LONEOS || — || align=right | 4.9 km || 
|-id=945 bgcolor=#E9E9E9
| 127945 ||  || — || April 24, 2003 || Kitt Peak || Spacewatch || HEN || align=right | 1.8 km || 
|-id=946 bgcolor=#fefefe
| 127946 ||  || — || April 24, 2003 || Anderson Mesa || LONEOS || V || align=right | 1.1 km || 
|-id=947 bgcolor=#E9E9E9
| 127947 ||  || — || April 24, 2003 || Anderson Mesa || LONEOS || — || align=right | 2.4 km || 
|-id=948 bgcolor=#fefefe
| 127948 ||  || — || April 25, 2003 || Kitt Peak || Spacewatch || — || align=right | 1.7 km || 
|-id=949 bgcolor=#E9E9E9
| 127949 ||  || — || April 25, 2003 || Kitt Peak || Spacewatch || — || align=right | 4.4 km || 
|-id=950 bgcolor=#d6d6d6
| 127950 ||  || — || April 25, 2003 || Kitt Peak || Spacewatch || — || align=right | 5.3 km || 
|-id=951 bgcolor=#d6d6d6
| 127951 ||  || — || April 25, 2003 || Kitt Peak || Spacewatch || — || align=right | 6.2 km || 
|-id=952 bgcolor=#d6d6d6
| 127952 ||  || — || April 26, 2003 || Kitt Peak || Spacewatch || — || align=right | 4.9 km || 
|-id=953 bgcolor=#E9E9E9
| 127953 ||  || — || April 24, 2003 || Kitt Peak || Spacewatch || — || align=right | 4.0 km || 
|-id=954 bgcolor=#fefefe
| 127954 ||  || — || April 24, 2003 || Kitt Peak || Spacewatch || — || align=right | 1.3 km || 
|-id=955 bgcolor=#E9E9E9
| 127955 ||  || — || April 25, 2003 || Campo Imperatore || CINEOS || — || align=right | 1.8 km || 
|-id=956 bgcolor=#fefefe
| 127956 ||  || — || April 26, 2003 || Haleakala || NEAT || NYS || align=right | 1.2 km || 
|-id=957 bgcolor=#E9E9E9
| 127957 ||  || — || April 26, 2003 || Haleakala || NEAT || — || align=right | 1.9 km || 
|-id=958 bgcolor=#fefefe
| 127958 ||  || — || April 25, 2003 || Campo Imperatore || CINEOS || — || align=right | 1.7 km || 
|-id=959 bgcolor=#fefefe
| 127959 ||  || — || April 26, 2003 || Haleakala || NEAT || NYS || align=right | 1.0 km || 
|-id=960 bgcolor=#fefefe
| 127960 ||  || — || April 24, 2003 || Anderson Mesa || LONEOS || V || align=right | 1.1 km || 
|-id=961 bgcolor=#fefefe
| 127961 ||  || — || April 24, 2003 || Anderson Mesa || LONEOS || — || align=right | 1.4 km || 
|-id=962 bgcolor=#fefefe
| 127962 ||  || — || April 25, 2003 || Kitt Peak || Spacewatch || KLI || align=right | 3.1 km || 
|-id=963 bgcolor=#d6d6d6
| 127963 ||  || — || April 26, 2003 || Haleakala || NEAT || — || align=right | 5.6 km || 
|-id=964 bgcolor=#fefefe
| 127964 ||  || — || April 26, 2003 || Haleakala || NEAT || — || align=right | 1.7 km || 
|-id=965 bgcolor=#fefefe
| 127965 ||  || — || April 24, 2003 || Campo Imperatore || CINEOS || — || align=right | 1.2 km || 
|-id=966 bgcolor=#fefefe
| 127966 ||  || — || April 27, 2003 || Anderson Mesa || LONEOS || ERI || align=right | 2.3 km || 
|-id=967 bgcolor=#E9E9E9
| 127967 ||  || — || April 28, 2003 || Socorro || LINEAR || — || align=right | 1.6 km || 
|-id=968 bgcolor=#E9E9E9
| 127968 ||  || — || April 26, 2003 || Haleakala || NEAT || — || align=right | 2.2 km || 
|-id=969 bgcolor=#E9E9E9
| 127969 ||  || — || April 26, 2003 || Kitt Peak || Spacewatch || — || align=right | 1.5 km || 
|-id=970 bgcolor=#d6d6d6
| 127970 ||  || — || April 28, 2003 || Socorro || LINEAR || — || align=right | 7.4 km || 
|-id=971 bgcolor=#fefefe
| 127971 ||  || — || April 29, 2003 || Socorro || LINEAR || NYS || align=right | 1.2 km || 
|-id=972 bgcolor=#fefefe
| 127972 ||  || — || April 28, 2003 || Anderson Mesa || LONEOS || V || align=right | 1.9 km || 
|-id=973 bgcolor=#fefefe
| 127973 ||  || — || April 29, 2003 || Socorro || LINEAR || NYS || align=right | 3.1 km || 
|-id=974 bgcolor=#E9E9E9
| 127974 ||  || — || April 29, 2003 || Socorro || LINEAR || — || align=right | 1.8 km || 
|-id=975 bgcolor=#fefefe
| 127975 ||  || — || April 29, 2003 || Socorro || LINEAR || — || align=right | 1.3 km || 
|-id=976 bgcolor=#fefefe
| 127976 ||  || — || April 29, 2003 || Socorro || LINEAR || NYS || align=right | 1.0 km || 
|-id=977 bgcolor=#fefefe
| 127977 ||  || — || April 29, 2003 || Socorro || LINEAR || NYS || align=right | 1.4 km || 
|-id=978 bgcolor=#E9E9E9
| 127978 ||  || — || April 29, 2003 || Socorro || LINEAR || — || align=right | 3.8 km || 
|-id=979 bgcolor=#fefefe
| 127979 ||  || — || April 29, 2003 || Socorro || LINEAR || NYS || align=right | 1.4 km || 
|-id=980 bgcolor=#fefefe
| 127980 ||  || — || April 29, 2003 || Socorro || LINEAR || — || align=right | 1.6 km || 
|-id=981 bgcolor=#d6d6d6
| 127981 ||  || — || April 29, 2003 || Haleakala || NEAT || — || align=right | 6.7 km || 
|-id=982 bgcolor=#E9E9E9
| 127982 ||  || — || April 29, 2003 || Haleakala || NEAT || EUN || align=right | 2.5 km || 
|-id=983 bgcolor=#E9E9E9
| 127983 ||  || — || April 29, 2003 || Reedy Creek || J. Broughton || — || align=right | 2.1 km || 
|-id=984 bgcolor=#E9E9E9
| 127984 ||  || — || April 28, 2003 || Haleakala || NEAT || — || align=right | 2.2 km || 
|-id=985 bgcolor=#E9E9E9
| 127985 ||  || — || April 29, 2003 || Socorro || LINEAR || — || align=right | 1.7 km || 
|-id=986 bgcolor=#d6d6d6
| 127986 ||  || — || April 29, 2003 || Socorro || LINEAR || — || align=right | 4.8 km || 
|-id=987 bgcolor=#d6d6d6
| 127987 ||  || — || April 29, 2003 || Socorro || LINEAR || HYG || align=right | 5.9 km || 
|-id=988 bgcolor=#fefefe
| 127988 ||  || — || April 28, 2003 || Socorro || LINEAR || MAS || align=right | 1.4 km || 
|-id=989 bgcolor=#E9E9E9
| 127989 ||  || — || April 28, 2003 || Socorro || LINEAR || MAR || align=right | 1.9 km || 
|-id=990 bgcolor=#fefefe
| 127990 ||  || — || April 30, 2003 || Socorro || LINEAR || — || align=right | 1.5 km || 
|-id=991 bgcolor=#d6d6d6
| 127991 ||  || — || April 30, 2003 || Socorro || LINEAR || — || align=right | 6.7 km || 
|-id=992 bgcolor=#fefefe
| 127992 ||  || — || April 30, 2003 || Socorro || LINEAR || FLO || align=right | 1.7 km || 
|-id=993 bgcolor=#fefefe
| 127993 ||  || — || April 30, 2003 || Socorro || LINEAR || — || align=right | 1.3 km || 
|-id=994 bgcolor=#E9E9E9
| 127994 ||  || — || April 30, 2003 || Haleakala || NEAT || — || align=right | 5.0 km || 
|-id=995 bgcolor=#E9E9E9
| 127995 ||  || — || April 29, 2003 || Anderson Mesa || LONEOS || AGN || align=right | 1.9 km || 
|-id=996 bgcolor=#E9E9E9
| 127996 ||  || — || April 30, 2003 || Kitt Peak || Spacewatch || HNS || align=right | 2.6 km || 
|-id=997 bgcolor=#fefefe
| 127997 ||  || — || April 28, 2003 || Socorro || LINEAR || V || align=right | 1.2 km || 
|-id=998 bgcolor=#E9E9E9
| 127998 ||  || — || April 28, 2003 || Socorro || LINEAR || — || align=right | 3.3 km || 
|-id=999 bgcolor=#fefefe
| 127999 ||  || — || April 29, 2003 || Kitt Peak || Spacewatch || V || align=right | 1.2 km || 
|-id=000 bgcolor=#fefefe
| 128000 ||  || — || April 30, 2003 || Socorro || LINEAR || — || align=right | 2.2 km || 
|}

References

External links 
 Discovery Circumstances: Numbered Minor Planets (125001)–(130000) (IAU Minor Planet Center)

0127